= List of human protein-coding genes 7 =

Human protein-coding genes listed in the HGNC database
index	Gene symbol	HGNC and UniProt ID(s)
13501	RBM12B	HGNC:32310; Q8IXT5
13502	RBM14	HGNC:14219; Q96PK6
13503	RBM15	HGNC:14959; Q96T37
13504	RBM15B	HGNC:24303; Q8NDT2
13505	RBM17	HGNC:16944; Q96I25
13506	RBM18	HGNC:28413; Q96H35
13507	RBM19	HGNC:29098; Q9Y4C8
13508	RBM20	HGNC:27424; Q5T481
13509	RBM22	HGNC:25503; Q9NW64
13510	RBM23	HGNC:20155; Q86U06
13511	RBM24	HGNC:21539; Q9BX46
13512	RBM25	HGNC:23244; P49756
13513	RBM26	HGNC:20327; Q5T8P6
13514	RBM27	HGNC:29243; Q9P2N5
13515	RBM28	HGNC:21863; Q9NW13
13516	RBM33	HGNC:27223; Q96EV2
13517	RBM34	HGNC:28965; P42696
13518	RBM38	HGNC:15818; Q9H0Z9
13519	RBM39	HGNC:15923; Q14498
13520	RBM41	HGNC:25617; Q96IZ5
13521	RBM42	HGNC:28117; Q9BTD8
13522	RBM43	HGNC:24790; Q6ZSC3
13523	RBM44	HGNC:24756; Q6ZP01
13524	RBM45	HGNC:24468; Q8IUH3
13525	RBM46	HGNC:28401; Q8TBY0
13526	RBM47	HGNC:30358; A0AV96
13527	RBM48	HGNC:21785; Q5RL73
13528	RBMS1	HGNC:9907; P29558
13529	RBMS2	HGNC:9909; Q15434
13530	RBMS3	HGNC:13427; Q6XE24
13531	RBMX	HGNC:9910; P38159
13532	RBMX2	HGNC:24282; Q9Y388
13533	RBMXL1	HGNC:25073; Q96E39
13534	RBMXL2	HGNC:17886; O75526
13535	RBMXL3	HGNC:26859; Q8N7X1
13536	RBMY1A1	HGNC:9912; P0DJD3
13537	RBMY1B	HGNC:23914; A6NDE4
13538	RBMY1C	HGNC:9914; P0DJD4
13539	RBMY1D	HGNC:23915; P0C7P1
13540	RBMY1E	HGNC:23916; A6NEQ0
13541	RBMY1F	HGNC:23974; Q15415
13542	RBMY1J	HGNC:23917; Q15415
13543	RBP1	HGNC:9919; P09455
13544	RBP2	HGNC:9920; P50120
13545	RBP3	HGNC:9921; P10745
13546	RBP4	HGNC:9922; P02753
13547	RBP5	HGNC:15847; P82980
13548	RBP7	HGNC:30316; Q96R05
13549	RBPJ	HGNC:5724; Q06330
13550	RBPJL	HGNC:13761; Q9UBG7
13551	RBPMS	HGNC:19097; Q93062
13552	RBPMS2	HGNC:19098; Q6ZRY4
13553	RBSN	HGNC:20759; Q9H1K0
13554	RBX1	HGNC:9928; P62877
13555	RC3H1	HGNC:29434; Q5TC82
13556	RC3H2	HGNC:21461; Q9HBD1
13557	RCAN1	HGNC:3040; P53805
13558	RCAN2	HGNC:3041; Q14206
13559	RCAN3	HGNC:3042; Q9UKA8
13560	RCBTB1	HGNC:18243; Q8NDN9
13561	RCBTB2	HGNC:1914; O95199
13562	RCC1	HGNC:1913; P18754
13563	RCC1L	HGNC:14948; Q96I51
13564	RCC2	HGNC:30297; Q9P258
13565	RCCD1	HGNC:30457; A6NED2
13566	RCE1	HGNC:13721; Q9Y256
13567	RCHY1	HGNC:17479; Q96PM5
13568	RCL1	HGNC:17687; Q9Y2P8
13569	RCN1	HGNC:9934; Q15293
13570	RCN2	HGNC:9935; Q14257
13571	RCN3	HGNC:21145; Q96D15
13572	RCOR1	HGNC:17441; Q9UKL0
13573	RCOR2	HGNC:27455; Q8IZ40
13574	RCOR3	HGNC:25594; Q9P2K3
13575	RCSD1	HGNC:28310; Q6JBY9
13576	RCVRN	HGNC:9937; P35243
13577	RD3	HGNC:19689; Q7Z3Z2
13578	RD3L	HGNC:40912; P0DJH9
13579	RDH5	HGNC:9940; Q92781
13580	RDH8	HGNC:14423; Q9NYR8
13581	RDH10	HGNC:19975; Q8IZV5
13582	RDH11	HGNC:17964; Q8TC12
13583	RDH12	HGNC:19977; Q96NR8
13584	RDH13	HGNC:19978; Q8NBN7
13585	RDH14	HGNC:19979; Q9HBH5
13586	RDH16	HGNC:29674; O75452
13587	RDM1	HGNC:19950; Q8NG50
13588	RDX	HGNC:9944; P35241
13589	REC8	HGNC:16879; O95072
13590	REC114	HGNC:25065; Q7Z4M0
13591	RECK	HGNC:11345; O95980
13592	RECQL	HGNC:9948; P46063
13593	RECQL4	HGNC:9949; O94761
13594	RECQL5	HGNC:9950; O94762
13595	REDIC1	HGNC:26846; Q86WS4
13596	REELD1	HGNC:53638; A0A1B0GV85
13597	REEP1	HGNC:25786; Q9H902
13598	REEP2	HGNC:17975; Q9BRK0
13599	REEP3	HGNC:23711; Q6NUK4
13600	REEP4	HGNC:26176; Q9H6H4
13601	REEP5	HGNC:30077; Q00765
13602	REEP6	HGNC:30078; Q96HR9
13603	REG1A	HGNC:9951; P05451
13604	REG1B	HGNC:9952; P48304
13605	REG3A	HGNC:8601; Q06141
13606	REG3G	HGNC:29595; Q6UW15
13607	REG4	HGNC:22977; Q9BYZ8
13608	REL	HGNC:9954; Q04864
13609	RELA	HGNC:9955; Q04206
13610	RELB	HGNC:9956; Q01201
13611	RELCH	HGNC:29289; Q9P260
13612	RELL1	HGNC:27379; Q8IUW5
13613	RELL2	HGNC:26902; Q8NC24
13614	RELN	HGNC:9957; P78509
13615	RELT	HGNC:13764; Q969Z4
13616	REM1	HGNC:15922; O75628
13617	REM2	HGNC:20248; Q8IYK8
13618	REN	HGNC:9958; P00797
13619	RENBP	HGNC:9959; P51606
13620	REP15	HGNC:33748; Q6BDI9
13621	REPIN1	HGNC:17922; Q9BWE0
13622	REPS1	HGNC:15578; Q96D71
13623	REPS2	HGNC:9963; Q8NFH8
13624	RER1	HGNC:30309; O15258
13625	RERE	HGNC:9965; Q9P2R6
13626	RERG	HGNC:15980; Q96A58
13627	RERGL	HGNC:26213; Q9H628
13628	RESF1	HGNC:25559; Q9HCM1
13629	RESP18	HGNC:33762; Q5W5W9
13630	REST	HGNC:9966; Q13127
13631	RET	HGNC:9967; P07949
13632	RETN	HGNC:20389; Q9HD89
13633	RETNLB	HGNC:20388; Q9BQ08
13634	RETREG1	HGNC:25964; Q9H6L5
13635	RETREG2	HGNC:28450; Q8NC44
13636	RETREG3	HGNC:27258; Q86VR2
13637	RETSAT	HGNC:25991; Q6NUM9
13638	REV1	HGNC:14060; Q9UBZ9
13639	REV3L	HGNC:9968; O60673
13640	REX1BD	HGNC:26098; Q96EN9
13641	REXO1	HGNC:24616; Q8N1G1
13642	REXO2	HGNC:17851; Q9Y3B8
13643	REXO4	HGNC:12820; Q9GZR2
13644	REXO5	HGNC:24661; Q96IC2
13645	RFC1	HGNC:9969; P35251
13646	RFC2	HGNC:9970; P35250
13647	RFC3	HGNC:9971; P40938
13648	RFC4	HGNC:9972; P35249
13649	RFC5	HGNC:9973; P40937
13650	RFESD	HGNC:29587; Q8TAC1
13651	RFFL	HGNC:24821; Q8WZ73
13652	RFK	HGNC:30324; Q969G6
13653	RFLNA	HGNC:27051; Q6ZTI6
13654	RFLNB	HGNC:28705; Q8N5W9
13655	RFNG	HGNC:9974; Q9Y644
13656	RFPL1	HGNC:9977; O75677
13657	RFPL2	HGNC:9979; O75678
13658	RFPL3	HGNC:9980; O75679
13659	RFPL4A	HGNC:16449; A6NLU0
13660	RFPL4AL1	HGNC:45147; F8VTS6
13661	RFPL4B	HGNC:33264; Q6ZWI9
13662	RFT1	HGNC:30220; Q96AA3
13663	RFTN1	HGNC:30278; Q14699
13664	RFTN2	HGNC:26402; Q52LD8
13665	RFWD3	HGNC:25539; Q6PCD5
13666	RFX1	HGNC:9982; P22670
13667	RFX2	HGNC:9983; P48378
13668	RFX3	HGNC:9984; P48380
13669	RFX4	HGNC:9985; Q33E94
13670	RFX5	HGNC:9986; P48382
13671	RFX6	HGNC:21478; Q8HWS3
13672	RFX7	HGNC:25777; Q2KHR2
13673	RFX8	HGNC:37253; Q6ZV50
13674	RFXANK	HGNC:9987; O14593
13675	RFXAP	HGNC:9988; O00287
13676	RGCC	HGNC:20369; Q9H4X1
13677	RGL1	HGNC:30281; Q9NZL6
13678	RGL2	HGNC:9769; O15211
13679	RGL3	HGNC:30282; Q3MIN7
13680	RGL4	HGNC:31911; Q8IZJ4
13681	RGMA	HGNC:30308; Q96B86
13682	RGMB	HGNC:26896; Q6NW40
13683	RGN	HGNC:9989; Q15493
13684	RGP1	HGNC:21965; Q92546
13685	RGPD1	HGNC:32414; P0DJD0
13686	RGPD2	HGNC:32415; P0DJD1
13687	RGPD3	HGNC:32416; A6NKT7
13688	RGPD4	HGNC:32417; Q7Z3J3
13689	RGPD5	HGNC:32418; Q99666
13690	RGPD6	HGNC:32419; Q99666
13691	RGPD8	HGNC:9849; O14715
13692	RGR	HGNC:9990; P47804
13693	RGS1	HGNC:9991; Q08116
13694	RGS2	HGNC:9998; P41220
13695	RGS3	HGNC:9999; P49796
13696	RGS4	HGNC:10000; P49798
13697	RGS5	HGNC:10001; O15539
13698	RGS6	HGNC:10002; P49758
13699	RGS7	HGNC:10003; P49802
13700	RGS7BP	HGNC:23271; Q6MZT1
13701	RGS8	HGNC:16810; P57771
13702	RGS9	HGNC:10004; O75916
13703	RGS9BP	HGNC:30304; Q6ZS82
13704	RGS10	HGNC:9992; O43665
13705	RGS11	HGNC:9993; O94810
13706	RGS12	HGNC:9994; O14924
13707	RGS13	HGNC:9995; O14921
13708	RGS14	HGNC:9996; O43566
13709	RGS16	HGNC:9997; O15492
13710	RGS17	HGNC:14088; Q9UGC6
13711	RGS18	HGNC:14261; Q9NS28
13712	RGS19	HGNC:13735; P49795
13713	RGS20	HGNC:14600; O76081
13714	RGS21	HGNC:26839; Q2M5E4
13715	RGS22	HGNC:24499; Q8NE09
13716	RGSL1	HGNC:18636; A5PLK6
13717	RHAG	HGNC:10006; Q02094
13718	RHBDD1	HGNC:23081; Q8TEB9
13719	RHBDD2	HGNC:23082; Q6NTF9
13720	RHBDD3	HGNC:1308; Q9Y3P4
13721	RHBDF1	HGNC:20561; Q96CC6
13722	RHBDF2	HGNC:20788; Q6PJF5
13723	RHBDL1	HGNC:10007; O75783
13724	RHBDL2	HGNC:16083; Q9NX52
13725	RHBDL3	HGNC:16502; P58872
13726	RHBG	HGNC:14572; Q9H310
13727	RHCE	HGNC:10008; P18577
13728	RHCG	HGNC:18140; Q9UBD6
13729	RHD	HGNC:10009; Q02161
13730	RHEB	HGNC:10011; Q15382
13731	RHEBL1	HGNC:21166; Q8TAI7
13732	RHEX	HGNC:25341; Q6ZWK4
13733	RHNO1	HGNC:28206; Q9BSD3
13734	RHO	HGNC:10012; P08100
13735	RHOA	HGNC:667; P61586
13736	RHOB	HGNC:668; P62745
13737	RHOBTB1	HGNC:18738; O94844
13738	RHOBTB2	HGNC:18756; Q9BYZ6
13739	RHOBTB3	HGNC:18757; O94955
13740	RHOC	HGNC:669; P08134
13741	RHOD	HGNC:670; O00212
13742	RHOF	HGNC:15703; Q9HBH0
13743	RHOG	HGNC:672; P84095
13744	RHOH	HGNC:686; Q15669
13745	RHOJ	HGNC:688; Q9H4E5
13746	RHOQ	HGNC:17736; P17081
13747	RHOT1	HGNC:21168; Q8IXI2
13748	RHOT2	HGNC:21169; Q8IXI1
13749	RHOU	HGNC:17794; Q7L0Q8
13750	RHOV	HGNC:18313; Q96L33
13751	RHOXF1	HGNC:29993; Q8NHV9
13752	RHOXF2	HGNC:30011; Q9BQY4
13753	RHOXF2B	HGNC:33519; P0C7M4
13754	RHPN1	HGNC:19973; Q8TCX5
13755	RHPN2	HGNC:19974; Q8IUC4
13756	RIBC1	HGNC:26537; Q8N443
13757	RIBC2	HGNC:13241; Q9H4K1
13758	RIC1	HGNC:17686; Q4ADV7
13759	RIC3	HGNC:30338; Q7Z5B4
13760	RIC8A	HGNC:29550; Q9NPQ8
13761	RIC8B	HGNC:25555; Q9NVN3
13762	RICTOR	HGNC:28611; Q6R327
13763	RIDA	HGNC:16897; P52758
13764	RIF1	HGNC:23207; Q5UIP0
13765	RIGI	HGNC:19102; O95786
13766	RIIAD1	HGNC:26686; A6NNX1
13767	RILP	HGNC:30266; Q96NA2
13768	RILPL1	HGNC:26814; Q5EBL4
13769	RILPL2	HGNC:28787; Q969X0
13770	RIMBP2	HGNC:30339; O15034
13771	RIMBP3	HGNC:29344; Q9UFD9
13772	RIMBP3B	HGNC:33891; A6NNM3
13773	RIMBP3C	HGNC:33892; A6NJZ7
13774	RIMKLA	HGNC:28725; Q8IXN7
13775	RIMKLB	HGNC:29228; Q9ULI2
13776	RIMOC1	HGNC:27750; A6NDU8
13777	RIMS1	HGNC:17282; Q86UR5
13778	RIMS2	HGNC:17283; Q9UQ26
13779	RIMS3	HGNC:21292; Q9UJD0
13780	RIMS4	HGNC:16183; Q9H426
13781	RIN1	HGNC:18749; Q13671
13782	RIN2	HGNC:18750; Q8WYP3
13783	RIN3	HGNC:18751; Q8TB24
13784	RING1	HGNC:10018; Q06587
13785	RINL	HGNC:24795; Q6ZS11
13786	RINT1	HGNC:21876; Q6NUQ1
13787	RIOK1	HGNC:18656; Q9BRS2
13788	RIOK2	HGNC:18999; Q9BVS4
13789	RIOK3	HGNC:11451; O14730
13790	RIOX1	HGNC:20968; Q9H6W3
13791	RIOX2	HGNC:19441; Q8IUF8
13792	RIPK1	HGNC:10019; Q13546
13793	RIPK2	HGNC:10020; O43353
13794	RIPK3	HGNC:10021; Q9Y572
13795	RIPK4	HGNC:496; P57078
13796	RIPOR1	HGNC:25836; Q6ZS17
13797	RIPOR2	HGNC:13872; Q9Y4F9
13798	RIPOR3	HGNC:16168; Q96MK2
13799	RIPPLY1	HGNC:25117; Q0D2K3
13800	RIPPLY2	HGNC:21390; Q5TAB7
13801	RIPPLY3	HGNC:3047; P57055
13802	RIT1	HGNC:10023; Q92963
13803	RIT2	HGNC:10017; Q99578
13804	RITA1	HGNC:25925; Q96K30
13805	RLBP1	HGNC:10024; P12271
13806	RLF	HGNC:10025; Q13129
13807	RLIG1	HGNC:25322; Q8N999
13808	RLIM	HGNC:13429; Q9NVW2
13809	RLN1	HGNC:10026; P04808
13810	RLN2	HGNC:10027; P04090
13811	RLN3	HGNC:17135; Q8WXF3
13812	RMC1	HGNC:24326; Q96DM3
13813	RMDN1	HGNC:24285; Q96DB5
13814	RMDN2	HGNC:26567; Q96LZ7
13815	RMDN3	HGNC:25550; Q96TC7
13816	RMI1	HGNC:25764; Q9H9A7
13817	RMI2	HGNC:28349; Q96E14
13818	RMND1	HGNC:21176; Q9NWS8
13819	RMND5A	HGNC:25850; Q9H871
13820	RMND5B	HGNC:26181; Q96G75
13821	RMP24	HGNC:28802; Q32NC0
13822	RMP64	HGNC:24496; Q6NW34
13823	RNASE1	HGNC:10044; P07998
13824	RNASE2	HGNC:10045; P10153
13825	RNASE3	HGNC:10046; P12724
13826	RNASE4	HGNC:10047; P34096
13827	RNASE6	HGNC:10048; Q93091
13828	RNASE7	HGNC:19278; Q9H1E1
13829	RNASE8	HGNC:19277; Q8TDE3
13830	RNASE9	HGNC:20673; P60153
13831	RNASE10	HGNC:19275; Q5GAN6
13832	RNASE11	HGNC:19269; Q8TAA1
13833	RNASE12	HGNC:24211; Q5GAN4
13834	RNASE13	HGNC:25285; Q5GAN3
13835	RNASEH1	HGNC:18466; O60930
13836	RNASEH2A	HGNC:18518; O75792
13837	RNASEH2B	HGNC:25671; Q5TBB1
13838	RNASEH2C	HGNC:24116; Q8TDP1
13839	RNASEK	HGNC:33911; Q6P5S7
13840	RNASEL	HGNC:10050; Q05823
13841	RNASET2	HGNC:21686; O00584
13842	RND1	HGNC:18314; Q92730
13843	RND2	HGNC:18315; P52198
13844	RND3	HGNC:671; P61587
13845	RNF2	HGNC:10061; Q99496
13846	RNF4	HGNC:10067; P78317
13847	RNF5	HGNC:10068; Q99942
13848	RNF6	HGNC:10069; Q9Y252
13849	RNF7	HGNC:10070; Q9UBF6
13850	RNF8	HGNC:10071; O76064
13851	RNF10	HGNC:10055; Q8N5U6
13852	RNF11	HGNC:10056; Q9Y3C5
13853	RNF13	HGNC:10057; O43567
13854	RNF14	HGNC:10058; Q9UBS8
13855	RNF17	HGNC:10060; Q9BXT8
13856	RNF19A	HGNC:13432; Q9NV58
13857	RNF19B	HGNC:26886; Q6ZMZ0
13858	RNF20	HGNC:10062; Q5VTR2
13859	RNF24	HGNC:13779; Q9Y225
13860	RNF25	HGNC:14662; Q96BH1
13861	RNF26	HGNC:14646; Q9BY78
13862	RNF31	HGNC:16031; Q96EP0
13863	RNF32	HGNC:17118; Q9H0A6
13864	RNF34	HGNC:17297; Q969K3
13865	RNF38	HGNC:18052; Q9H0F5
13866	RNF39	HGNC:18064; Q9H2S5
13867	RNF40	HGNC:16867; O75150
13868	RNF41	HGNC:18401; Q9H4P4
13869	RNF43	HGNC:18505; Q68DV7
13870	RNF44	HGNC:19180; Q7L0R7
13871	RNF103	HGNC:12859; O00237
13872	RNF111	HGNC:17384; Q6ZNA4
13873	RNF112	HGNC:12968; Q9ULX5
13874	RNF113A	HGNC:12974; O15541
13875	RNF113B	HGNC:17267; Q8IZP6
13876	RNF114	HGNC:13094; Q9Y508
13877	RNF115	HGNC:18154; Q9Y4L5
13878	RNF121	HGNC:21070; Q9H920
13879	RNF122	HGNC:21147; Q9H9V4
13880	RNF123	HGNC:21148; Q5XPI4
13881	RNF125	HGNC:21150; Q96EQ8
13882	RNF126	HGNC:21151; Q9BV68
13883	RNF128	HGNC:21153; Q8TEB7
13884	RNF130	HGNC:18280; Q86XS8
13885	RNF133	HGNC:21154; Q8WVZ7
13886	RNF135	HGNC:21158; Q8IUD6
13887	RNF138	HGNC:17765; Q8WVD3
13888	RNF139	HGNC:17023; Q8WU17
13889	RNF141	HGNC:21159; Q8WVD5
13890	RNF144A	HGNC:20457; P50876
13891	RNF144B	HGNC:21578; Q7Z419
13892	RNF145	HGNC:20853; Q96MT1
13893	RNF146	HGNC:21336; Q9NTX7
13894	RNF148	HGNC:22411; Q8N7C7
13895	RNF149	HGNC:23137; Q8NC42
13896	RNF150	HGNC:23138; Q9ULK6
13897	RNF151	HGNC:23235; Q2KHN1
13898	RNF152	HGNC:26811; Q8N8N0
13899	RNF157	HGNC:29402; Q96PX1
13900	RNF166	HGNC:28856; Q96A37
13901	RNF167	HGNC:24544; Q9H6Y7
13902	RNF168	HGNC:26661; Q8IYW5
13903	RNF169	HGNC:26961; Q8NCN4
13904	RNF170	HGNC:25358; Q96K19
13905	RNF175	HGNC:27735; Q8N4F7
13906	RNF180	HGNC:27752; Q86T96
13907	RNF181	HGNC:28037; Q9P0P0
13908	RNF182	HGNC:28522; Q8N6D2
13909	RNF183	HGNC:28721; Q96D59
13910	RNF185	HGNC:26783; Q96GF1
13911	RNF186	HGNC:25978; Q9NXI6
13912	RNF187	HGNC:27146; Q5TA31
13913	RNF207	HGNC:32947; Q6ZRF8
13914	RNF208	HGNC:25420; Q9H0X6
13915	RNF212	HGNC:27729; Q495C1
13916	RNF212B	HGNC:20438; A8MTL3
13917	RNF213	HGNC:14539; Q63HN8
13918	RNF214	HGNC:25335; Q8ND24
13919	RNF215	HGNC:33434; Q9Y6U7
13920	RNF216	HGNC:21698; Q9NWF9
13921	RNF217	HGNC:21487; Q8TC41
13922	RNF220	HGNC:25552; Q5VTB9
13923	RNF222	HGNC:34517; A6NCQ9
13924	RNF223	HGNC:40020; E7ERA6
13925	RNF224	HGNC:41912; P0DH78
13926	RNF225	HGNC:51249; M0QZC1
13927	RNF227	HGNC:27571; A6NIN4
13928	RNF228	HGNC:55809; A0A7I2V3R4
13929	RNFT1	HGNC:30206; Q5M7Z0
13930	RNFT2	HGNC:25905; Q96EX2
13931	RNGTT	HGNC:10073; O60942
13932	RNH1	HGNC:10074; P13489
13933	RNLS	HGNC:25641; Q5VYX0
13934	RNMT	HGNC:10075; O43148
13935	RNPC3	HGNC:18666; Q96LT9
13936	RNPEP	HGNC:10078; Q9H4A4
13937	RNPEPL1	HGNC:10079; Q9HAU8
13938	RNPS1	HGNC:10080; Q15287
13939	RO60	HGNC:11313; P10155
13940	ROBO1	HGNC:10249; Q9Y6N7
13941	ROBO2	HGNC:10250; Q9HCK4
13942	ROBO3	HGNC:13433; Q96MS0
13943	ROBO4	HGNC:17985; Q8WZ75
13944	ROCK1	HGNC:10251; Q13464
13945	ROCK2	HGNC:10252; O75116
13946	ROGDI	HGNC:29478; Q9GZN7
13947	ROM1	HGNC:10254; Q03395
13948	ROMO1	HGNC:16185; P60602
13949	ROPN1	HGNC:17692; Q9HAT0
13950	ROPN1B	HGNC:31927; Q9BZX4
13951	ROPN1L	HGNC:24060; Q96C74
13952	ROR1	HGNC:10256; Q01973
13953	ROR2	HGNC:10257; Q01974
13954	RORA	HGNC:10258; P35398
13955	RORB	HGNC:10259; Q92753
13956	RORC	HGNC:10260; P51449
13957	ROS1	HGNC:10261; P08922
13958	RP1	HGNC:10263; P56715
13959	RP1L1	HGNC:15946; Q8IWN7
13960	RP2	HGNC:10274; O75695
13961	RP9	HGNC:10288; Q8TA86
13962	RPA1	HGNC:10289; P27694
13963	RPA2	HGNC:10290; P15927
13964	RPA3	HGNC:10291; P35244
13965	RPA4	HGNC:30305; Q13156
13966	RPAIN	HGNC:28641; Q86UA6
13967	RPAP1	HGNC:24567; Q9BWH6
13968	RPAP2	HGNC:25791; Q8IXW5
13969	RPAP3	HGNC:26151; Q9H6T3
13970	RPE	HGNC:10293; Q96AT9
13971	RPE65	HGNC:10294; Q16518
13972	RPEL1	HGNC:45241; Q2QD12
13973	RPF1	HGNC:30350; Q9H9Y2
13974	RPF2	HGNC:20870; Q9H7B2
13975	RPGR	HGNC:10295; Q92834
13976	RPGRIP1	HGNC:13436; Q96KN7
13977	RPGRIP1L	HGNC:29168; Q68CZ1
13978	RPH3A	HGNC:17056; Q9Y2J0
13979	RPH3AL	HGNC:10296; Q9UNE2
13980	RPIA	HGNC:10297; P49247
13981	RPL3	HGNC:10332; P39023
13982	RPL3L	HGNC:10351; Q92901
13983	RPL4	HGNC:10353; P36578
13984	RPL5	HGNC:10360; P46777
13985	RPL6	HGNC:10362; Q02878
13986	RPL7	HGNC:10363; P18124
13987	RPL7A	HGNC:10364; P62424
13988	RPL7L1	HGNC:21370; Q6DKI1
13989	RPL8	HGNC:10368; P62917
13990	RPL9	HGNC:10369; P32969
13991	RPL10	HGNC:10298; P27635
13992	RPL10A	HGNC:10299; P62906
13993	RPL10L	HGNC:17976; Q96L21
13994	RPL11	HGNC:10301; P62913
13995	RPL12	HGNC:10302; P30050
13996	RPL13	HGNC:10303; P26373
13997	RPL13A	HGNC:10304; P40429
13998	RPL14	HGNC:10305; P50914
13999	RPL15	HGNC:10306; P61313
14000	RPL17	HGNC:10307; P18621
14001	RPL18	HGNC:10310; Q07020
14002	RPL18A	HGNC:10311; Q02543
14003	RPL19	HGNC:10312; P84098
14004	RPL21	HGNC:10313; P46778
14005	RPL22	HGNC:10315; P35268
14006	RPL22L1	HGNC:27610; Q6P5R6
14007	RPL23	HGNC:10316; P62829
14008	RPL23A	HGNC:10317; P62750
14009	RPL24	HGNC:10325; P83731
14010	RPL26	HGNC:10327; P61254
14011	RPL26L1	HGNC:17050; Q9UNX3
14012	RPL27	HGNC:10328; P61353
14013	RPL27A	HGNC:10329; P46776
14014	RPL28	HGNC:10330; P46779
14015	RPL29	HGNC:10331; P47914
14016	RPL30	HGNC:10333; P62888
14017	RPL31	HGNC:10334; P62899
14018	RPL32	HGNC:10336; P62910
14019	RPL34	HGNC:10340; P49207
14020	RPL35	HGNC:10344; P42766
14021	RPL35A	HGNC:10345; P18077
14022	RPL36	HGNC:13631; Q9Y3U8
14023	RPL36A	HGNC:10359; P83881
14024	RPL36AL	HGNC:10346; Q969Q0
14025	RPL37	HGNC:10347; P61927
14026	RPL37A	HGNC:10348; P61513
14027	RPL38	HGNC:10349; P63173
14028	RPL39	HGNC:10350; P62891
14029	RPL39L	HGNC:17094; Q96EH5
14030	RPL41	HGNC:10354; P62945
14031	RPLP0	HGNC:10371; P05388
14032	RPLP1	HGNC:10372; P05386
14033	RPLP2	HGNC:10377; P05387
14034	RPN1	HGNC:10381; P04843
14035	RPN2	HGNC:10382; P04844
14036	RPP14	HGNC:30327; O95059
14037	RPP21	HGNC:21300; Q9H633
14038	RPP25	HGNC:30361; Q9BUL9
14039	RPP25L	HGNC:19909; Q8N5L8
14040	RPP30	HGNC:17688; P78346
14041	RPP38	HGNC:30329; P78345
14042	RPP40	HGNC:20992; O75818
14043	RPRD1A	HGNC:25560; Q96P16
14044	RPRD1B	HGNC:16209; Q9NQG5
14045	RPRD2	HGNC:29039; Q5VT52
14046	RPRM	HGNC:24201; Q9NS64
14047	RPRML	HGNC:32422; Q8N4K4
14048	RPS2	HGNC:10404; P15880
14049	RPS3	HGNC:10420; P23396
14050	RPS3A	HGNC:10421; P61247
14051	RPS4X	HGNC:10424; P62701
14052	RPS4Y1	HGNC:10425; P22090
14053	RPS4Y2	HGNC:18501; Q8TD47
14054	RPS5	HGNC:10426; P46782
14055	RPS6	HGNC:10429; P62753
14056	RPS6KA1	HGNC:10430; Q15418
14057	RPS6KA2	HGNC:10431; Q15349
14058	RPS6KA3	HGNC:10432; P51812
14059	RPS6KA4	HGNC:10433; O75676
14060	RPS6KA5	HGNC:10434; O75582
14061	RPS6KA6	HGNC:10435; Q9UK32
14062	RPS6KB1	HGNC:10436; P23443
14063	RPS6KB2	HGNC:10437; Q9UBS0
14064	RPS6KC1	HGNC:10439; Q96S38
14065	RPS6KL1	HGNC:20222; Q9Y6S9
14066	RPS7	HGNC:10440; P62081
14067	RPS8	HGNC:10441; P62241
14068	RPS9	HGNC:10442; P46781
14069	RPS10	HGNC:10383; P46783
14070	RPS11	HGNC:10384; P62280
14071	RPS12	HGNC:10385; P25398
14072	RPS13	HGNC:10386; P62277
14073	RPS14	HGNC:10387; P62263
14074	RPS15	HGNC:10388; P62841
14075	RPS15A	HGNC:10389; P62244
14076	RPS16	HGNC:10396; P62249
14077	RPS17	HGNC:10397; P08708
14078	RPS18	HGNC:10401; P62269
14079	RPS19	HGNC:10402; P39019
14080	RPS19BP1	HGNC:28749; Q86WX3
14081	RPS20	HGNC:10405; P60866
14082	RPS21	HGNC:10409; P63220
14083	RPS23	HGNC:10410; P62266
14084	RPS24	HGNC:10411; P62847
14085	RPS25	HGNC:10413; P62851
14086	RPS26	HGNC:10414; P62854
14087	RPS27	HGNC:10416; P42677
14088	RPS27A	HGNC:10417; P62979
14089	RPS27L	HGNC:18476; Q71UM5
14090	RPS28	HGNC:10418; P62857
14091	RPS29	HGNC:10419; P62273
14092	RPSA	HGNC:6502; P08865
14093	RPSA2	HGNC:36809; A0A8I5KQE6
14094	RPTN	HGNC:26809; Q6XPR3
14095	RPTOR	HGNC:30287; Q8N122
14096	RPUSD1	HGNC:14173; Q9UJJ7
14097	RPUSD2	HGNC:24180; Q8IZ73
14098	RPUSD3	HGNC:28437; Q6P087
14099	RPUSD4	HGNC:25898; Q96CM3
14100	RRAD	HGNC:10446; P55042
14101	RRAGA	HGNC:16963; Q7L523
14102	RRAGB	HGNC:19901; Q5VZM2
14103	RRAGC	HGNC:19902; Q9HB90
14104	RRAGD	HGNC:19903; Q9NQL2
14105	RRAS	HGNC:10447; P10301
14106	RRAS2	HGNC:17271; P62070
14107	RRBP1	HGNC:10448; Q9P2E9
14108	RREB1	HGNC:10449; Q92766
14109	RRH	HGNC:10450; O14718
14110	RRM1	HGNC:10451; P23921
14111	RRM2	HGNC:10452; P31350
14112	RRM2B	HGNC:17296; Q7LG56
14113	RRN3	HGNC:30346; Q9NYV6
14114	RRP1	HGNC:18785; P56182
14115	RRP1B	HGNC:23818; Q14684
14116	RRP7A	HGNC:24286; Q9Y3A4
14117	RRP8	HGNC:29030; O43159
14118	RRP9	HGNC:16829; O43818
14119	RRP12	HGNC:29100; Q5JTH9
14120	RRP15	HGNC:24255; Q9Y3B9
14121	RRP36	HGNC:21374; Q96EU6
14122	RRS1	HGNC:17083; Q15050
14123	RS1	HGNC:10457; O15537
14124	RSAD1	HGNC:25634; Q9HA92
14125	RSAD2	HGNC:30908; Q8WXG1
14126	RSBN1	HGNC:25642; Q5VWQ0
14127	RSBN1L	HGNC:24765; Q6PCB5
14128	RSC1A1	HGNC:10458; Q92681
14129	RSF1	HGNC:18118; Q96T23
14130	RSKR	HGNC:26314; Q96LW2
14131	RSL1D1	HGNC:24534; O76021
14132	RSL24D1	HGNC:18479; Q9UHA3
14133	RSPH1	HGNC:12371; Q8WYR4
14134	RSPH3	HGNC:21054; Q86UC2
14135	RSPH4A	HGNC:21558; Q5TD94
14136	RSPH6A	HGNC:14241; Q9H0K4
14137	RSPH9	HGNC:21057; Q9H1X1
14138	RSPH10B	HGNC:27362; P0C881
14139	RSPH10B2	HGNC:34385; B2RC85
14140	RSPH14	HGNC:13437; Q9UHP6
14141	RSPO1	HGNC:21679; Q2MKA7
14142	RSPO2	HGNC:28583; Q6UXX9
14143	RSPO3	HGNC:20866; Q9BXY4
14144	RSPO4	HGNC:16175; Q2I0M5
14145	RSPRY1	HGNC:29420; Q96DX4
14146	RSRC1	HGNC:24152; Q96IZ7
14147	RSRC2	HGNC:30559; Q7L4I2
14148	RSRP1	HGNC:25234; Q9BUV0
14149	RSU1	HGNC:10464; Q15404
14150	RTBDN	HGNC:30310; Q9BSG5
14151	RTCA	HGNC:17981; O00442
14152	RTCB	HGNC:26935; Q9Y3I0
14153	RTEL1	HGNC:15888; Q9NZ71
14154	RTF1	HGNC:28996; Q92541
14155	RTF2	HGNC:15890; Q9BY42
14156	RTKN	HGNC:10466; Q9BST9
14157	RTKN2	HGNC:19364; Q8IZC4
14158	RTL1	HGNC:14665; A6NKG5
14159	RTL3	HGNC:22997; Q8N8U3
14160	RTL4	HGNC:25214; Q6ZR62
14161	RTL5	HGNC:29430; Q5HYW3
14162	RTL6	HGNC:13343; Q6ICC9
14163	RTL8A	HGNC:24514; Q9BWD3
14164	RTL8B	HGNC:33156; Q17RB0
14165	RTL8C	HGNC:2569; A6ZKI3, O15255
14166	RTL9	HGNC:29245; Q8NET4
14167	RTL10	HGNC:26112; Q7L3V2
14168	RTN1	HGNC:10467; Q16799
14169	RTN2	HGNC:10468; O75298
14170	RTN3	HGNC:10469; O95197
14171	RTN4	HGNC:14085; Q9NQC3
14172	RTN4IP1	HGNC:18647; Q8WWV3
14173	RTN4R	HGNC:18601; Q9BZR6
14174	RTN4RL1	HGNC:21329; Q86UN2
14175	RTN4RL2	HGNC:23053; Q86UN3
14176	RTP1	HGNC:28580; P59025
14177	RTP2	HGNC:32486; Q5QGT7
14178	RTP3	HGNC:15572; Q9BQQ7
14179	RTP4	HGNC:23992; Q96DX8
14180	RTP5	HGNC:26585; Q14D33
14181	RTRAF	HGNC:23169; Q9Y224
14182	RTTN	HGNC:18654; Q86VV8
14183	RUBCN	HGNC:28991; Q92622
14184	RUBCNL	HGNC:20420; Q9H714
14185	RUFY1	HGNC:19760; Q96T51
14186	RUFY2	HGNC:19761; Q8WXA3
14187	RUFY3	HGNC:30285; Q7L099
14188	RUFY4	HGNC:24804; Q6ZNE9
14189	RUNDC1	HGNC:25418; Q96C34
14190	RUNDC3A	HGNC:16984; Q59EK9
14191	RUNDC3B	HGNC:30286; Q96NL0
14192	RUNX1	HGNC:10471; Q01196
14193	RUNX1T1	HGNC:1535; Q06455
14194	RUNX2	HGNC:10472; Q13950
14195	RUNX3	HGNC:10473; Q13761
14196	RUSC1	HGNC:17153; Q9BVN2
14197	RUSC2	HGNC:23625; Q8N2Y8
14198	RUSF1	HGNC:25848; Q96GQ5
14199	RUVBL1	HGNC:10474; Q9Y265
14200	RUVBL2	HGNC:10475; Q9Y230
14201	RWDD1	HGNC:20993; Q9H446
14202	RWDD2A	HGNC:21385; Q9UIY3
14203	RWDD2B	HGNC:1302; P57060
14204	RWDD3	HGNC:21393; Q9Y3V2
14205	RWDD4	HGNC:23750; Q6NW29
14206	RXFP1	HGNC:19718; Q9HBX9
14207	RXFP2	HGNC:17318; Q8WXD0
14208	RXFP3	HGNC:24883; Q9NSD7
14209	RXFP4	HGNC:14666; Q8TDU9
14210	RXRA	HGNC:10477; P19793
14211	RXRB	HGNC:10478; P28702
14212	RXRG	HGNC:10479; P48443
14213	RXYLT1	HGNC:13530; Q9Y2B1
14214	RYBP	HGNC:10480; Q8N488
14215	RYK	HGNC:10481; P34925
14216	RYR1	HGNC:10483; P21817
14217	RYR2	HGNC:10484; Q92736
14218	RYR3	HGNC:10485; Q15413
14219	S1PR1	HGNC:3165; P21453
14220	S1PR2	HGNC:3169; O95136
14221	S1PR3	HGNC:3167; Q99500
14222	S1PR4	HGNC:3170; O95977
14223	S1PR5	HGNC:14299; Q9H228
14224	S100A1	HGNC:10486; P23297
14225	S100A2	HGNC:10492; P29034
14226	S100A3	HGNC:10493; P33764
14227	S100A4	HGNC:10494; P26447
14228	S100A5	HGNC:10495; P33763
14229	S100A6	HGNC:10496; P06703
14230	S100A7	HGNC:10497; P31151
14231	S100A7A	HGNC:21657; Q86SG5
14232	S100A8	HGNC:10498; P05109
14233	S100A9	HGNC:10499; P06702
14234	S100A10	HGNC:10487; P60903
14235	S100A11	HGNC:10488; P31949
14236	S100A12	HGNC:10489; P80511
14237	S100A13	HGNC:10490; Q99584
14238	S100A14	HGNC:18901; Q9HCY8
14239	S100A16	HGNC:20441; Q96FQ6
14240	S100B	HGNC:10500; P04271
14241	S100G	HGNC:1436; P29377
14242	S100P	HGNC:10504; P25815
14243	S100PBP	HGNC:25768; Q96BU1
14244	S100Z	HGNC:30367; Q8WXG8
14245	SAA1	HGNC:10513; P0DJI8
14246	SAA2	HGNC:10514; P0DJI9
14247	SAA4	HGNC:10516; P35542
14248	SAAL1	HGNC:25158; Q96ER3
14249	SAC3D1	HGNC:30179; A6NKF1
14250	SACM1L	HGNC:17059; Q9NTJ5
14251	SACS	HGNC:10519; Q9NZJ4
14252	SAE1	HGNC:30660; Q9UBE0
14253	SAFB	HGNC:10520; Q15424
14254	SAFB2	HGNC:21605; Q14151
14255	SAG	HGNC:10521; P10523
14256	SAGE1	HGNC:30369; Q9NXZ1
14257	SALL1	HGNC:10524; Q9NSC2
14258	SALL2	HGNC:10526; Q9Y467
14259	SALL3	HGNC:10527; Q9BXA9
14260	SALL4	HGNC:15924; Q9UJQ4
14261	SAMD1	HGNC:17958; Q6SPF0
14262	SAMD3	HGNC:21574; Q8N6K7
14263	SAMD4A	HGNC:23023; Q9UPU9
14264	SAMD4B	HGNC:25492; Q5PRF9
14265	SAMD5	HGNC:21180; Q5TGI4
14266	SAMD7	HGNC:25394; Q7Z3H4
14267	SAMD8	HGNC:26320; Q96LT4
14268	SAMD9	HGNC:1348; Q5K651
14269	SAMD9L	HGNC:1349; Q8IVG5
14270	SAMD10	HGNC:16129; Q9BYL1
14271	SAMD11	HGNC:28706; Q96NU1
14272	SAMD12	HGNC:31750; Q8N8I0
14273	SAMD13	HGNC:24582; Q5VXD3
14274	SAMD14	HGNC:27312; Q8IZD0
14275	SAMD15	HGNC:18631; Q9P1V8
14276	SAMHD1	HGNC:15925; Q9Y3Z3
14277	SAMM50	HGNC:24276; Q9Y512
14278	SAMSN1	HGNC:10528; Q9NSI8
14279	SAMTOR	HGNC:26475; Q1RMZ1
14280	SANBR	HGNC:29387; Q6NSI8
14281	SAP18	HGNC:10530; O00422
14282	SAP25	HGNC:41908; Q8TEE9
14283	SAP30	HGNC:10532; O75446
14284	SAP30BP	HGNC:30785; Q9UHR5
14285	SAP30L	HGNC:25663; Q9HAJ7
14286	SAP130	HGNC:29813; Q9H0E3
14287	SAPCD1	HGNC:13938; Q5SSQ6
14288	SAPCD2	HGNC:28055; Q86UD0
14289	SAR1A	HGNC:10534; Q9NR31
14290	SAR1B	HGNC:10535; Q9Y6B6
14291	SARAF	HGNC:28789; Q96BY9
14292	SARDH	HGNC:10536; Q9UL12
14293	SARM1	HGNC:17074; Q6SZW1
14294	SARNP	HGNC:24432; P82979
14295	SARS1	HGNC:10537; P49591
14296	SARS2	HGNC:17697; Q9NP81
14297	SART1	HGNC:10538; O43290
14298	SART3	HGNC:16860; Q15020
14299	SASH1	HGNC:19182; O94885
14300	SASH3	HGNC:15975; O75995
14301	SASS6	HGNC:25403; Q6UVJ0
14302	SAT1	HGNC:10540; P21673
14303	SAT2	HGNC:23160; Q96F10
14304	SATB1	HGNC:10541; Q01826
14305	SATB2	HGNC:21637; Q9UPW6
14306	SATL1	HGNC:27992; Q86VE3
14307	SAV1	HGNC:17795; Q9H4B6
14308	SAXO1	HGNC:28566; Q8IYX7
14309	SAXO2	HGNC:33727; Q658L1
14310	SAXO3	HGNC:56771; A0A1B0GTJ6
14311	SAXO4	HGNC:28869; Q7Z5V6
14312	SAXO5	HGNC:24745; Q8NA69
14313	SAYSD1	HGNC:21025; Q9NPB0
14314	SBDS	HGNC:19440; Q9Y3A5
14315	SBF1	HGNC:10542; O95248
14316	SBF2	HGNC:2135; Q86WG5
14317	SBK1	HGNC:17699; Q52WX2
14318	SBK2	HGNC:34416; P0C263
14319	SBK3	HGNC:44121; P0C264
14320	SBNO1	HGNC:22973; A3KN83
14321	SBNO2	HGNC:29158; Q9Y2G9
14322	SBSN	HGNC:24950; Q6UWP8
14323	SBSPON	HGNC:30362; Q8IVN8
14324	SC5D	HGNC:10547; O75845
14325	SCAF1	HGNC:30403; Q9H7N4
14326	SCAF4	HGNC:19304; O95104
14327	SCAF8	HGNC:20959; Q9UPN6
14328	SCAF11	HGNC:10784; Q99590
14329	SCAI	HGNC:26709; Q8N9R8
14330	SCAMP1	HGNC:10563; O15126
14331	SCAMP2	HGNC:10564; O15127
14332	SCAMP3	HGNC:10565; O14828
14333	SCAMP4	HGNC:30385; Q969E2
14334	SCAMP5	HGNC:30386; Q8TAC9
14335	SCAND1	HGNC:10566; P57086
14336	SCAND3	HGNC:13851; Q6R2W3
14337	SCAP	HGNC:30634; Q12770
14338	SCAPER	HGNC:13081; Q9BY12
14339	SCARA3	HGNC:19000; Q6AZY7
14340	SCARA5	HGNC:28701; Q6ZMJ2
14341	SCARB1	HGNC:1664; Q8WTV0
14342	SCARB2	HGNC:1665; Q14108
14343	SCARF1	HGNC:16820; Q14162
14344	SCARF2	HGNC:19869; Q96GP6
14345	SCART1	HGNC:32411; Q4G0T1
14346	SCCPDH	HGNC:24275; Q8NBX0
14347	SCD	HGNC:10571; O00767
14348	SCD5	HGNC:21088; Q86SK9
14349	SCEL	HGNC:10573; O95171
14350	SCFD1	HGNC:20726; Q8WVM8
14351	SCFD2	HGNC:30676; Q8WU76
14352	SCG2	HGNC:10575; P13521
14353	SCG3	HGNC:13707; Q8WXD2
14354	SCG5	HGNC:10816; P05408
14355	SCGB1A1	HGNC:12523; P11684
14356	SCGB1C1	HGNC:18394; Q8TD33
14357	SCGB1C2	HGNC:51242; P0DMR2
14358	SCGB1D1	HGNC:18395; O95968
14359	SCGB1D2	HGNC:18396; O95969
14360	SCGB1D4	HGNC:31748; Q6XE38
14361	SCGB2A1	HGNC:7051; O75556
14362	SCGB2A2	HGNC:7050; Q13296
14363	SCGB2B2	HGNC:27616; Q4G0G5
14364	SCGB3A1	HGNC:18384; Q96QR1
14365	SCGB3A2	HGNC:18391; Q96PL1
14366	SCGN	HGNC:16941; O76038
14367	SCHIP1	HGNC:15678; P0DPB3
14368	SCIMP	HGNC:33504; Q6UWF3
14369	SCIN	HGNC:21695; Q9Y6U3
14370	SCLT1	HGNC:26406; Q96NL6
14371	SCLY	HGNC:18161; Q96I15
14372	SCMH1	HGNC:19003; Q96GD3
14373	SCML1	HGNC:10580; Q9UN30
14374	SCML2	HGNC:10581; Q9UQR0
14375	SCML4	HGNC:21397; Q8N228
14376	SCN1A	HGNC:10585; P35498
14377	SCN1B	HGNC:10586; Q07699
14378	SCN2A	HGNC:10588; Q99250
14379	SCN2B	HGNC:10589; O60939
14380	SCN3A	HGNC:10590; Q9NY46
14381	SCN3B	HGNC:20665; Q9NY72
14382	SCN4A	HGNC:10591; P35499
14383	SCN4B	HGNC:10592; Q8IWT1
14384	SCN5A	HGNC:10593; Q14524
14385	SCN7A	HGNC:10594; Q01118
14386	SCN8A	HGNC:10596; Q9UQD0
14387	SCN9A	HGNC:10597; Q15858
14388	SCN10A	HGNC:10582; Q9Y5Y9
14389	SCN11A	HGNC:10583; Q9UI33
14390	SCNM1	HGNC:23136; Q9BWG6
14391	SCNN1A	HGNC:10599; P37088
14392	SCNN1B	HGNC:10600; P51168
14393	SCNN1D	HGNC:10601; P51172
14394	SCNN1G	HGNC:10602; P51170
14395	SCO1	HGNC:10603; O75880
14396	SCO2	HGNC:10604; O43819
14397	SCOC	HGNC:20335; Q9UIL1
14398	SCP2	HGNC:10606; P22307
14399	SCP2D1	HGNC:16211; Q9UJQ7
14400	SCPEP1	HGNC:29507; Q9HB40
14401	SCPPPQ1	HGNC:56851; A0A411D538
14402	SCRG1	HGNC:17036; O75711
14403	SCRIB	HGNC:30377; C0HLS1, Q14160
14404	SCRN1	HGNC:22192; Q12765
14405	SCRN2	HGNC:30381; Q96FV2
14406	SCRN3	HGNC:30382; Q0VDG4
14407	SCRT1	HGNC:15950; Q9BWW7
14408	SCRT2	HGNC:15952; Q9NQ03
14409	SCT	HGNC:10607; P09683
14410	SCTR	HGNC:10608; P47872
14411	SCUBE1	HGNC:13441; Q8IWY4
14412	SCUBE2	HGNC:30425; Q9NQ36
14413	SCUBE3	HGNC:13655; Q8IX30
14414	SCX	HGNC:32322; Q7RTU7
14415	SCYGR1	HGNC:34218; A0A286YEY9
14416	SCYGR2	HGNC:34220; A0A286YFB4
14417	SCYGR3	HGNC:34222; A0A286YF60
14418	SCYGR4	HGNC:34223; A0A286YEV6
14419	SCYGR5	HGNC:34224; A0A286YF46
14420	SCYGR6	HGNC:34225; A0A286YF77
14421	SCYGR7	HGNC:34226; A0A286YF01
14422	SCYGR8	HGNC:34227; A0A286YFG1
14423	SCYGR10	HGNC:34221; A0A286YEX9
14424	SCYL1	HGNC:14372; Q96KG9
14425	SCYL2	HGNC:19286; Q6P3W7
14426	SCYL3	HGNC:19285; Q8IZE3
14427	SDAD1	HGNC:25537; Q9NVU7
14428	SDC1	HGNC:10658; P18827
14429	SDC2	HGNC:10659; P34741
14430	SDC3	HGNC:10660; O75056
14431	SDC4	HGNC:10661; P31431
14432	SDCBP	HGNC:10662; O00560
14433	SDCBP2	HGNC:15756; Q9H190
14434	SDCCAG8	HGNC:10671; Q86SQ7
14435	SDE2	HGNC:26643; Q6IQ49
14436	SDF2	HGNC:10675; Q99470
14437	SDF2L1	HGNC:10676; Q9HCN8
14438	SDF4	HGNC:24188; Q9BRK5
14439	SDHA	HGNC:10680; P31040
14440	SDHAF1	HGNC:33867; A6NFY7
14441	SDHAF2	HGNC:26034; Q9NX18
14442	SDHAF3	HGNC:21752; Q9NRP4
14443	SDHAF4	HGNC:20957; Q5VUM1
14444	SDHB	HGNC:10681; P21912
14445	SDHC	HGNC:10682; Q99643
14446	SDHD	HGNC:10683; O14521
14447	SDIM1	HGNC:38749; Q6ZPB5
14448	SDK1	HGNC:19307; Q7Z5N4
14449	SDK2	HGNC:19308; Q58EX2
14450	SDR9C7	HGNC:29958; Q8NEX9
14451	SDR16C5	HGNC:30311; Q8N3Y7
14452	SDR39U1	HGNC:20275; Q9NRG7
14453	SDR42E1	HGNC:29834; Q8WUS8
14454	SDR42E2	HGNC:35414; A6NKP2
14455	SDS	HGNC:10691; P20132
14456	SDSL	HGNC:30404; Q96GA7
14457	SEBOX	HGNC:32942; Q9HB31
14458	SEC11A	HGNC:17718; P67812
14459	SEC11C	HGNC:23400; Q9BY50
14460	SEC13	HGNC:10697; P55735
14461	SEC14L1	HGNC:10698; Q92503
14462	SEC14L2	HGNC:10699; O76054
14463	SEC14L3	HGNC:18655; Q9UDX4
14464	SEC14L4	HGNC:20627; Q9UDX3
14465	SEC14L5	HGNC:29032; O43304
14466	SEC14L6	HGNC:40047; B5MCN3
14467	SEC16A	HGNC:29006; O15027
14468	SEC16B	HGNC:30301; Q96JE7
14469	SEC22A	HGNC:20260; Q96IW7
14470	SEC22B	HGNC:10700; O75396
14471	SEC22C	HGNC:16828; Q9BRL7
14472	SEC23A	HGNC:10701; Q15436
14473	SEC23B	HGNC:10702; Q15437
14474	SEC23IP	HGNC:17018; Q9Y6Y8
14475	SEC24A	HGNC:10703; O95486
14476	SEC24B	HGNC:10704; O95487
14477	SEC24C	HGNC:10705; P53992
14478	SEC24D	HGNC:10706; O94855
14479	SEC31A	HGNC:17052; O94979
14480	SEC31B	HGNC:23197; Q9NQW1
14481	SEC61A1	HGNC:18276; P61619
14482	SEC61A2	HGNC:17702; Q9H9S3
14483	SEC61B	HGNC:16993; P60468
14484	SEC61G	HGNC:18277; P60059
14485	SEC62	HGNC:11846; Q99442
14486	SEC63	HGNC:21082; Q9UGP8
14487	SECISBP2	HGNC:30972; Q96T21
14488	SECISBP2L	HGNC:28997; Q93073
14489	SECTM1	HGNC:10707; Q8WVN6
14490	SEH1L	HGNC:30379; Q96EE3
14491	SEL1L	HGNC:10717; Q9UBV2
14492	SEL1L2	HGNC:15897; Q5TEA6
14493	SEL1L3	HGNC:29108; Q68CR1
14494	SELE	HGNC:10718; P16581
14495	SELENBP1	HGNC:10719; Q13228
14496	SELENOF	HGNC:17705; O60613
14497	SELENOH	HGNC:18251; Q8IZQ5
14498	SELENOI	HGNC:29361; Q9C0D9
14499	SELENOK	HGNC:30394; Q9Y6D0
14500	SELENOM	HGNC:30397; Q8WWX9
14501	SELENON	HGNC:15999; Q9NZV5
14502	SELENOO	HGNC:30395; Q9BVL4
14503	SELENOP	HGNC:10751; P49908
14504	SELENOS	HGNC:30396; Q9BQE4
14505	SELENOT	HGNC:18136; P62341
14506	SELENOV	HGNC:30399; P59797
14507	SELENOW	HGNC:10752; P63302
14508	SELL	HGNC:10720; P14151
14509	SELP	HGNC:10721; P16109
14510	SELPLG	HGNC:10722; Q14242
14511	SEM1	HGNC:10845; P60896, Q6ZVN7
14512	SEMA3A	HGNC:10723; Q14563
14513	SEMA3B	HGNC:10724; Q13214
14514	SEMA3C	HGNC:10725; Q99985
14515	SEMA3D	HGNC:10726; O95025
14516	SEMA3E	HGNC:10727; O15041
14517	SEMA3F	HGNC:10728; Q13275
14518	SEMA3G	HGNC:30400; Q9NS98
14519	SEMA4A	HGNC:10729; Q9H3S1
14520	SEMA4B	HGNC:10730; Q9NPR2
14521	SEMA4C	HGNC:10731; Q9C0C4
14522	SEMA4D	HGNC:10732; Q92854
14523	SEMA4F	HGNC:10734; O95754
14524	SEMA4G	HGNC:10735; Q9NTN9
14525	SEMA5A	HGNC:10736; Q13591
14526	SEMA5B	HGNC:10737; Q9P283
14527	SEMA6A	HGNC:10738; Q9H2E6
14528	SEMA6B	HGNC:10739; Q9H3T3
14529	SEMA6C	HGNC:10740; Q9H3T2
14530	SEMA6D	HGNC:16770; Q8NFY4
14531	SEMA7A	HGNC:10741; O75326
14532	SEMG1	HGNC:10742; P04279
14533	SEMG2	HGNC:10743; Q02383
14534	SENP1	HGNC:17927; Q9P0U3
14535	SENP2	HGNC:23116; Q9HC62
14536	SENP3	HGNC:17862; Q9H4L4
14537	SENP5	HGNC:28407; Q96HI0
14538	SENP6	HGNC:20944; Q9GZR1
14539	SENP7	HGNC:30402; Q9BQF6
14540	SENP8	HGNC:22992; Q96LD8
14541	SEPHS1	HGNC:19685; P49903
14542	SEPHS2	HGNC:19686; Q99611
14543	SEPSECS	HGNC:30605; Q9HD40
14544	SEPTIN1	HGNC:2879; Q8WYJ6
14545	SEPTIN2	HGNC:7729; Q15019
14546	SEPTIN3	HGNC:10750; Q9UH03
14547	SEPTIN4	HGNC:9165; O43236
14548	SEPTIN5	HGNC:9164; Q99719
14549	SEPTIN6	HGNC:15848; Q14141
14550	SEPTIN7	HGNC:1717; Q16181
14551	SEPTIN8	HGNC:16511; Q92599
14552	SEPTIN9	HGNC:7323; Q9UHD8
14553	SEPTIN10	HGNC:14349; Q9P0V9
14554	SEPTIN11	HGNC:25589; Q9NVA2
14555	SEPTIN12	HGNC:26348; Q8IYM1
14556	SEPTIN14	HGNC:33280; Q6ZU15
14557	SERAC1	HGNC:21061; Q96JX3
14558	SERBP1	HGNC:17860; Q8NC51
14559	SERF1A	HGNC:10755; O75920
14560	SERF1B	HGNC:10756; O75920
14561	SERF2	HGNC:10757; P84101
14562	SERGEF	HGNC:17499; Q9UGK8
14563	SERHL2	HGNC:29446; Q9H4I8
14564	SERINC1	HGNC:13464; Q9NRX5
14565	SERINC2	HGNC:23231; Q96SA4
14566	SERINC3	HGNC:11699; Q13530
14567	SERINC4	HGNC:32237; A6NH21
14568	SERINC5	HGNC:18825; Q86VE9
14569	SERP1	HGNC:10759; Q9Y6X1
14570	SERP2	HGNC:20607; Q8N6R1
14571	SERPINA1	HGNC:8941; P01009
14572	SERPINA2	HGNC:8985; P20848
14573	SERPINA3	HGNC:16; P01011
14574	SERPINA4	HGNC:8948; P29622
14575	SERPINA5	HGNC:8723; P05154
14576	SERPINA6	HGNC:1540; P08185
14577	SERPINA7	HGNC:11583; P05543
14578	SERPINA9	HGNC:15995; Q86WD7
14579	SERPINA10	HGNC:15996; Q9UK55
14580	SERPINA11	HGNC:19193; Q86U17
14581	SERPINA12	HGNC:18359; Q8IW75
14582	SERPINB1	HGNC:3311; P30740
14583	SERPINB2	HGNC:8584; P05120
14584	SERPINB3	HGNC:10569; P29508
14585	SERPINB4	HGNC:10570; P48594
14586	SERPINB5	HGNC:8949; P36952
14587	SERPINB6	HGNC:8950; P35237
14588	SERPINB7	HGNC:13902; O75635
14589	SERPINB8	HGNC:8952; P50452
14590	SERPINB9	HGNC:8955; P50453
14591	SERPINB10	HGNC:8942; P48595
14592	SERPINB11	HGNC:14221; Q96P15
14593	SERPINB12	HGNC:14220; Q96P63
14594	SERPINB13	HGNC:8944; Q9UIV8
14595	SERPINC1	HGNC:775; P01008
14596	SERPIND1	HGNC:4838; P05546
14597	SERPINE1	HGNC:8583; P05121
14598	SERPINE2	HGNC:8951; P07093
14599	SERPINE3	HGNC:24774; A8MV23
14600	SERPINF1	HGNC:8824; P36955
14601	SERPINF2	HGNC:9075; P08697
14602	SERPING1	HGNC:1228; P05155
14603	SERPINH1	HGNC:1546; P50454
14604	SERPINI1	HGNC:8943; Q99574
14605	SERPINI2	HGNC:8945; O75830
14606	SERTAD1	HGNC:17932; Q9UHV2
14607	SERTAD2	HGNC:30784; Q14140
14608	SERTAD3	HGNC:17931; Q9UJW9
14609	SERTAD4	HGNC:25236; Q9NUC0
14610	SERTM1	HGNC:33792; A2A2V5
14611	SERTM2	HGNC:48576; A0A1B0GWG4
14612	SESN1	HGNC:21595; Q9Y6P5
14613	SESN2	HGNC:20746; P58004
14614	SESN3	HGNC:23060; P58005
14615	SESTD1	HGNC:18379; Q86VW0
14616	SET	HGNC:10760; Q01105
14617	SETBP1	HGNC:15573; Q9Y6X0
14618	SETD1A	HGNC:29010; O15047
14619	SETD1B	HGNC:29187; Q9UPS6
14620	SETD2	HGNC:18420; Q9BYW2
14621	SETD3	HGNC:20493; Q86TU7
14622	SETD4	HGNC:1258; Q9NVD3
14623	SETD5	HGNC:25566; Q9C0A6
14624	SETD6	HGNC:26116; Q8TBK2
14625	SETD7	HGNC:30412; Q8WTS6
14626	SETD9	HGNC:28508; Q8NE22
14627	SETDB1	HGNC:10761; Q15047
14628	SETDB2	HGNC:20263; Q96T68
14629	SETMAR	HGNC:10762; Q53H47
14630	SETSIP	HGNC:42937; P0DME0
14631	SETX	HGNC:445; Q7Z333
14632	SEZ6	HGNC:15955; Q53EL9
14633	SEZ6L	HGNC:10763; Q9BYH1
14634	SEZ6L2	HGNC:30844; Q6UXD5
14635	SF1	HGNC:12950; Q15637
14636	SF3A1	HGNC:10765; Q15459
14637	SF3A2	HGNC:10766; Q15428
14638	SF3A3	HGNC:10767; Q12874
14639	SF3B1	HGNC:10768; O75533
14640	SF3B2	HGNC:10769; Q13435
14641	SF3B3	HGNC:10770; Q15393
14642	SF3B4	HGNC:10771; Q15427
14643	SF3B5	HGNC:21083; Q9BWJ5
14644	SF3B6	HGNC:30096; Q9Y3B4
14645	SFI1	HGNC:29064; A8K8P3
14646	SFMBT1	HGNC:20255; Q9UHJ3
14647	SFMBT2	HGNC:20256; Q5VUG0
14648	SFN	HGNC:10773; P31947
14649	SFPQ	HGNC:10774; P23246
14650	SFR1	HGNC:29574; Q86XK3
14651	SFRP1	HGNC:10776; Q8N474
14652	SFRP2	HGNC:10777; Q96HF1
14653	SFRP4	HGNC:10778; Q6FHJ7
14654	SFRP5	HGNC:10779; Q5T4F7
14655	SFSWAP	HGNC:10790; Q12872
14656	SFT2D1	HGNC:21102; Q8WV19
14657	SFT2D2	HGNC:25140; O95562
14658	SFT2D3	HGNC:28767; Q587I9
14659	SFTA2	HGNC:18386; Q6UW10
14660	SFTPA1	HGNC:10798; Q8IWL2
14661	SFTPA2	HGNC:10799; Q8IWL1
14662	SFTPB	HGNC:10801; P07988
14663	SFTPC	HGNC:10802; P11686
14664	SFTPD	HGNC:10803; P35247
14665	SFXN1	HGNC:16085; Q9H9B4
14666	SFXN2	HGNC:16086; Q96NB2
14667	SFXN3	HGNC:16087; Q9BWM7
14668	SFXN4	HGNC:16088; Q6P4A7
14669	SFXN5	HGNC:16073; Q8TD22
14670	SGCA	HGNC:10805; Q16586
14671	SGCB	HGNC:10806; Q16585
14672	SGCD	HGNC:10807; Q92629
14673	SGCE	HGNC:10808; O43556
14674	SGCG	HGNC:10809; Q13326
14675	SGCZ	HGNC:14075; Q96LD1
14676	SGF29	HGNC:25156; Q96ES7
14677	SGIP1	HGNC:25412; Q9BQI5
14678	SGK1	HGNC:10810; O00141
14679	SGK2	HGNC:13900; Q9HBY8
14680	SGK3	HGNC:10812; Q96BR1
14681	SGMS1	HGNC:29799; Q86VZ5
14682	SGMS2	HGNC:28395; Q8NHU3
14683	SGO1	HGNC:25088; Q5FBB7
14684	SGO2	HGNC:30812; Q562F6
14685	SGPL1	HGNC:10817; O95470
14686	SGPP1	HGNC:17720; Q9BX95
14687	SGPP2	HGNC:19953; Q8IWX5
14688	SGSH	HGNC:10818; P51688
14689	SGSM1	HGNC:29410; Q2NKQ1
14690	SGSM2	HGNC:29026; O43147
14691	SGSM3	HGNC:25228; Q96HU1
14692	SGTA	HGNC:10819; O43765
14693	SGTB	HGNC:23567; Q96EQ0
14694	SH2B1	HGNC:30417; Q9NRF2
14695	SH2B2	HGNC:17381; O14492
14696	SH2B3	HGNC:29605; Q9UQQ2
14697	SH2D1A	HGNC:10820; O60880
14698	SH2D1B	HGNC:30416; O14796
14699	SH2D2A	HGNC:10821; Q9NP31
14700	SH2D3A	HGNC:16885; Q9BRG2
14701	SH2D3C	HGNC:16884; Q8N5H7
14702	SH2D4A	HGNC:26102; Q9H788
14703	SH2D4B	HGNC:31440; Q5SQS7
14704	SH2D5	HGNC:28819; Q6ZV89
14705	SH2D6	HGNC:30439; Q7Z4S9
14706	SH2D7	HGNC:34549; A6NKC9
14707	SH3BGR	HGNC:10822; P55822
14708	SH3BGRL	HGNC:10823; O75368
14709	SH3BGRL2	HGNC:15567; Q9UJC5
14710	SH3BGRL3	HGNC:15568; Q9H299
14711	SH3BP1	HGNC:10824; Q9Y3L3
14712	SH3BP2	HGNC:10825; P78314
14713	SH3BP4	HGNC:10826; Q9P0V3
14714	SH3BP5	HGNC:10827; O60239
14715	SH3BP5L	HGNC:29360; Q7L8J4
14716	SH3D19	HGNC:30418; Q5HYK7
14717	SH3D21	HGNC:26236; A4FU49
14718	SH3GL1	HGNC:10830; Q99961
14719	SH3GL2	HGNC:10831; Q99962
14720	SH3GL3	HGNC:10832; Q99963
14721	SH3GLB1	HGNC:10833; Q9Y371
14722	SH3GLB2	HGNC:10834; Q9NR46
14723	SH3KBP1	HGNC:13867; Q96B97
14724	SH3PXD2A	HGNC:23664; Q5TCZ1
14725	SH3PXD2B	HGNC:29242; A1X283
14726	SH3RF1	HGNC:17650; Q7Z6J0
14727	SH3RF2	HGNC:26299; Q8TEC5
14728	SH3RF3	HGNC:24699; Q8TEJ3
14729	SH3TC1	HGNC:26009; Q8TE82
14730	SH3TC2	HGNC:29427; Q8TF17
14731	SH3YL1	HGNC:29546; Q96HL8
14732	SHANK1	HGNC:15474; Q9Y566
14733	SHANK2	HGNC:14295; Q9UPX8
14734	SHANK3	HGNC:14294; Q9BYB0
14735	SHARPIN	HGNC:25321; Q9H0F6
14736	SHB	HGNC:10838; Q15464
14737	SHBG	HGNC:10839; P04278
14738	SHC1	HGNC:10840; P29353
14739	SHC2	HGNC:29869; P98077
14740	SHC3	HGNC:18181; Q92529
14741	SHC4	HGNC:16743; Q6S5L8
14742	SHCBP1	HGNC:29547; Q8NEM2
14743	SHCBP1L	HGNC:16788; Q9BZQ2
14744	SHD	HGNC:30633; Q96IW2
14745	SHE	HGNC:27004; Q5VZ18
14746	SHF	HGNC:25116; Q7M4L6
14747	SHFL	HGNC:25649; Q9NUL5
14748	SHH	HGNC:10848; Q15465
14749	SHISA2	HGNC:20366; Q6UWI4
14750	SHISA3	HGNC:25159; A0PJX4
14751	SHISA4	HGNC:27139; Q96DD7
14752	SHISA5	HGNC:30376; Q8N114
14753	SHISA6	HGNC:34491; Q6ZSJ9
14754	SHISA7	HGNC:35409; A6NL88
14755	SHISA8	HGNC:18351; B8ZZ34
14756	SHISA9	HGNC:37231; B4DS77
14757	SHISAL1	HGNC:29335; Q3SXP7
14758	SHISAL2A	HGNC:28757; Q6UWV7
14759	SHISAL2B	HGNC:34236; A6NKW6
14760	SHKBP1	HGNC:19214; Q8TBC3
14761	SHLD1	HGNC:26318; Q8IYI0
14762	SHLD2	HGNC:28773; Q86V20
14763	SHLD3	HGNC:53826; Q6ZNX1
14764	SHMT1	HGNC:10850; P34896
14765	SHMT2	HGNC:10852; P34897
14766	SHOC1	HGNC:26535; Q5VXU9
14767	SHOC2	HGNC:15454; Q9UQ13
14768	SHOX	HGNC:10853; O15266
14769	SHOX2	HGNC:10854; O60902
14770	SHPK	HGNC:1492; Q9UHJ6
14771	SHPRH	HGNC:19336; Q149N8
14772	SHQ1	HGNC:25543; Q6PI26
14773	SHROOM1	HGNC:24084; Q2M3G4
14774	SHROOM2	HGNC:630; Q13796
14775	SHROOM3	HGNC:30422; Q8TF72
14776	SHROOM4	HGNC:29215; Q9ULL8
14777	SHTN1	HGNC:29319; A0MZ66
14778	SI	HGNC:10856; P14410
14779	SIAE	HGNC:18187; Q9HAT2
14780	SIAH1	HGNC:10857; Q8IUQ4
14781	SIAH2	HGNC:10858; O43255
14782	SIAH3	HGNC:30553; Q8IW03
14783	SIDT1	HGNC:25967; Q9NXL6
14784	SIDT2	HGNC:24272; Q8NBJ9
14785	SIGIRR	HGNC:30575; Q6IA17
14786	SIGLEC1	HGNC:11127; Q9BZZ2
14787	SIGLEC5	HGNC:10874; O15389
14788	SIGLEC6	HGNC:10875; O43699
14789	SIGLEC7	HGNC:10876; Q9Y286
14790	SIGLEC8	HGNC:10877; Q9NYZ4
14791	SIGLEC9	HGNC:10878; Q9Y336
14792	SIGLEC10	HGNC:15620; Q96LC7
14793	SIGLEC11	HGNC:15622; Q96RL6
14794	SIGLEC12	HGNC:15482; Q96PQ1
14795	SIGLEC14	HGNC:32926; Q08ET2
14796	SIGLEC15	HGNC:27596; Q6ZMC9
14797	SIGLEC16	HGNC:24851; A6NMB1
14798	SIGLECL1	HGNC:26856; Q8N7X8
14799	SIGMAR1	HGNC:8157; Q99720
14800	SIK1	HGNC:11142; P57059
14801	SIK2	HGNC:21680; Q9H0K1
14802	SIK3	HGNC:29165; Q9Y2K2
14803	SIKE1	HGNC:26119; Q9BRV8
14804	SIL1	HGNC:24624; Q9H173
14805	SIM1	HGNC:10882; P81133
14806	SIM2	HGNC:10883; Q14190
14807	SIMC1	HGNC:24779; Q8NDZ2
14808	SIN3A	HGNC:19353; Q96ST3
14809	SIN3B	HGNC:19354; O75182
14810	SINHCAF	HGNC:30702; Q9NP50
14811	SIPA1	HGNC:10885; Q96FS4
14812	SIPA1L1	HGNC:20284; O43166
14813	SIPA1L2	HGNC:23800; Q9P2F8
14814	SIPA1L3	HGNC:23801; O60292
14815	SIRPA	HGNC:9662; P78324
14816	SIRPB1	HGNC:15928; O00241, Q5TFQ8
14817	SIRPB2	HGNC:16247; Q5JXA9
14818	SIRPD	HGNC:16248; Q9H106
14819	SIRPG	HGNC:15757; Q9P1W8
14820	SIRT1	HGNC:14929; Q96EB6
14821	SIRT2	HGNC:10886; Q8IXJ6
14822	SIRT3	HGNC:14931; Q9NTG7
14823	SIRT4	HGNC:14932; Q9Y6E7
14824	SIRT5	HGNC:14933; Q9NXA8
14825	SIRT6	HGNC:14934; Q8N6T7
14826	SIRT7	HGNC:14935; Q9NRC8
14827	SIT1	HGNC:17710; Q9Y3P8
14828	SIVA1	HGNC:17712; O15304
14829	SIX1	HGNC:10887; Q15475
14830	SIX2	HGNC:10888; Q9NPC8
14831	SIX3	HGNC:10889; O95343
14832	SIX4	HGNC:10890; Q9UIU6
14833	SIX5	HGNC:10891; Q8N196
14834	SIX6	HGNC:10892; O95475
14835	SKA1	HGNC:28109; Q96BD8
14836	SKA2	HGNC:28006; Q8WVK7
14837	SKA3	HGNC:20262; Q8IX90
14838	SKAP1	HGNC:15605; Q86WV1
14839	SKAP2	HGNC:15687; O75563
14840	SKI	HGNC:10896; P12755
14841	SKIC2	HGNC:10898; Q15477
14842	SKIC3	HGNC:23639; Q6PGP7
14843	SKIC8	HGNC:30300; Q9GZS3
14844	SKIDA1	HGNC:32697; Q1XH10
14845	SKIL	HGNC:10897; P12757
14846	SKOR1	HGNC:21326; P84550
14847	SKOR2	HGNC:32695; Q2VWA4
14848	SKP1	HGNC:10899; P63208
14849	SKP2	HGNC:10901; Q13309
14850	SLA	HGNC:10902; Q13239
14851	SLA2	HGNC:17329; Q9H6Q3
14852	SLAIN1	HGNC:26387; Q8ND83
14853	SLAIN2	HGNC:29282; Q9P270
14854	SLAMF1	HGNC:10903; Q13291
14855	SLAMF6	HGNC:21392; Q96DU3
14856	SLAMF7	HGNC:21394; Q9NQ25
14857	SLAMF8	HGNC:21391; Q9P0V8
14858	SLAMF9	HGNC:18430; Q96A28
14859	SLBP	HGNC:10904; Q14493
14860	SLC1A1	HGNC:10939; P43005
14861	SLC1A2	HGNC:10940; P43004
14862	SLC1A3	HGNC:10941; P43003
14863	SLC1A4	HGNC:10942; P43007
14864	SLC1A5	HGNC:10943; Q15758
14865	SLC1A6	HGNC:10944; P48664
14866	SLC1A7	HGNC:10945; O00341
14867	SLC2A1	HGNC:11005; P11166
14868	SLC2A2	HGNC:11006; P11168
14869	SLC2A3	HGNC:11007; P11169
14870	SLC2A4	HGNC:11009; P14672
14871	SLC2A4RG	HGNC:15930; Q9NR83
14872	SLC2A5	HGNC:11010; P22732
14873	SLC2A6	HGNC:11011; Q9UGQ3
14874	SLC2A7	HGNC:13445; Q6PXP3
14875	SLC2A8	HGNC:13812; Q9NY64
14876	SLC2A9	HGNC:13446; Q9NRM0
14877	SLC2A10	HGNC:13444; O95528
14878	SLC2A11	HGNC:14239; Q9BYW1
14879	SLC2A12	HGNC:18067; Q8TD20
14880	SLC2A13	HGNC:15956; Q96QE2
14881	SLC2A14	HGNC:18301; Q8TDB8
14882	SLC3A1	HGNC:11025; Q07837
14883	SLC3A2	HGNC:11026; P08195
14884	SLC4A1	HGNC:11027; P02730
14885	SLC4A1AP	HGNC:13813; Q9BWU0
14886	SLC4A2	HGNC:11028; P04920
14887	SLC4A3	HGNC:11029; P48751
14888	SLC4A4	HGNC:11030; Q9Y6R1
14889	SLC4A5	HGNC:18168; Q9BY07
14890	SLC4A7	HGNC:11033; Q9Y6M7
14891	SLC4A8	HGNC:11034; Q2Y0W8
14892	SLC4A9	HGNC:11035; Q96Q91
14893	SLC4A10	HGNC:13811; Q6U841
14894	SLC4A11	HGNC:16438; Q8NBS3
14895	SLC5A1	HGNC:11036; P13866
14896	SLC5A2	HGNC:11037; P31639
14897	SLC5A3	HGNC:11038; P53794
14898	SLC5A4	HGNC:11039; Q9NY91
14899	SLC5A5	HGNC:11040; Q92911
14900	SLC5A6	HGNC:11041; Q9Y289
14901	SLC5A7	HGNC:14025; Q9GZV3
14902	SLC5A8	HGNC:19119; Q8N695
14903	SLC5A9	HGNC:22146; Q2M3M2
14904	SLC5A10	HGNC:23155; A0PJK1
14905	SLC5A11	HGNC:23091; Q8WWX8
14906	SLC5A12	HGNC:28750; Q1EHB4
14907	SLC6A1	HGNC:11042; P30531
14908	SLC6A2	HGNC:11048; P23975
14909	SLC6A3	HGNC:11049; Q01959
14910	SLC6A4	HGNC:11050; P31645
14911	SLC6A5	HGNC:11051; Q9Y345
14912	SLC6A6	HGNC:11052; P31641
14913	SLC6A7	HGNC:11054; Q99884
14914	SLC6A8	HGNC:11055; P48029
14915	SLC6A9	HGNC:11056; P48067
14916	SLC6A11	HGNC:11044; P48066
14917	SLC6A12	HGNC:11045; P48065
14918	SLC6A13	HGNC:11046; Q9NSD5
14919	SLC6A14	HGNC:11047; Q9UN76
14920	SLC6A15	HGNC:13621; Q9H2J7
14921	SLC6A16	HGNC:13622; Q9GZN6
14922	SLC6A17	HGNC:31399; Q9H1V8
14923	SLC6A18	HGNC:26441; Q96N87
14924	SLC6A19	HGNC:27960; Q695T7
14925	SLC6A20	HGNC:30927; Q9NP91
14926	SLC7A1	HGNC:11057; P30825
14927	SLC7A2	HGNC:11060; P52569
14928	SLC7A3	HGNC:11061; Q8WY07
14929	SLC7A4	HGNC:11062; O43246
14930	SLC7A5	HGNC:11063; Q01650
14931	SLC7A6	HGNC:11064; Q92536
14932	SLC7A6OS	HGNC:25807; Q96CW6
14933	SLC7A7	HGNC:11065; Q9UM01
14934	SLC7A8	HGNC:11066; Q9UHI5
14935	SLC7A9	HGNC:11067; P82251
14936	SLC7A10	HGNC:11058; Q9NS82
14937	SLC7A11	HGNC:11059; Q9UPY5
14938	SLC7A13	HGNC:23092; Q8TCU3
14939	SLC7A14	HGNC:29326; Q8TBB6
14940	SLC8A1	HGNC:11068; P32418
14941	SLC8A2	HGNC:11069; Q9UPR5
14942	SLC8A3	HGNC:11070; P57103
14943	SLC8B1	HGNC:26175; Q6J4K2
14944	SLC9A1	HGNC:11071; P19634
14945	SLC9A2	HGNC:11072; Q9UBY0
14946	SLC9A3	HGNC:11073; P48764
14947	SLC9A4	HGNC:11077; Q6AI14
14948	SLC9A5	HGNC:11078; Q14940
14949	SLC9A6	HGNC:11079; Q92581
14950	SLC9A7	HGNC:17123; Q96T83
14951	SLC9A8	HGNC:20728; Q9Y2E8
14952	SLC9A9	HGNC:20653; Q8IVB4
14953	SLC9B1	HGNC:24244; Q4ZJI4
14954	SLC9B2	HGNC:25143; Q86UD5
14955	SLC9C1	HGNC:31401; Q4G0N8
14956	SLC9C2	HGNC:28664; Q5TAH2
14957	SLC9D1	HGNC:20329; Q6UWJ1
14958	SLC10A1	HGNC:10905; Q14973
14959	SLC10A2	HGNC:10906; Q12908
14960	SLC10A3	HGNC:22979; P09131
14961	SLC10A4	HGNC:22980; Q96EP9
14962	SLC10A5	HGNC:22981; Q5PT55
14963	SLC10A6	HGNC:30603; Q3KNW5
14964	SLC10A7	HGNC:23088; Q0GE19
14965	SLC11A1	HGNC:10907; P49279
14966	SLC11A2	HGNC:10908; P49281
14967	SLC12A1	HGNC:10910; Q13621
14968	SLC12A2	HGNC:10911; P55011
14969	SLC12A3	HGNC:10912; P55017
14970	SLC12A4	HGNC:10913; Q9UP95
14971	SLC12A5	HGNC:13818; Q9H2X9
14972	SLC12A6	HGNC:10914; Q9UHW9
14973	SLC12A7	HGNC:10915; Q9Y666
14974	SLC12A8	HGNC:15595; A0AV02
14975	SLC12A9	HGNC:17435; Q9BXP2
14976	SLC13A1	HGNC:10916; Q9BZW2
14977	SLC13A2	HGNC:10917; Q13183
14978	SLC13A3	HGNC:14430; Q8WWT9
14979	SLC13A4	HGNC:15827; Q9UKG4
14980	SLC13A5	HGNC:23089; Q86YT5
14981	SLC14A1	HGNC:10918; Q13336
14982	SLC14A2	HGNC:10919; Q15849
14983	SLC15A1	HGNC:10920; P46059
14984	SLC15A2	HGNC:10921; Q16348
14985	SLC15A3	HGNC:18068; Q8IY34
14986	SLC15A4	HGNC:23090; Q8N697
14987	SLC15A5	HGNC:33455; A6NIM6
14988	SLC16A1	HGNC:10922; P53985
14989	SLC16A2	HGNC:10923; P36021
14990	SLC16A3	HGNC:10924; O15427
14991	SLC16A4	HGNC:10925; O15374
14992	SLC16A5	HGNC:10926; O15375
14993	SLC16A6	HGNC:10927; O15403
14994	SLC16A7	HGNC:10928; O60669
14995	SLC16A8	HGNC:16270; O95907
14996	SLC16A9	HGNC:23520; Q7RTY1
14997	SLC16A10	HGNC:17027; Q8TF71
14998	SLC16A11	HGNC:23093; Q8NCK7
14999	SLC16A12	HGNC:23094; Q6ZSM3
15000	SLC16A13	HGNC:31037; Q7RTY0
15001	SLC16A14	HGNC:26417; Q7RTX9
15002	SLC17A1	HGNC:10929; Q14916
15003	SLC17A2	HGNC:10930; O00624
15004	SLC17A3	HGNC:10931; O00476
15005	SLC17A4	HGNC:10932; Q9Y2C5
15006	SLC17A5	HGNC:10933; Q9NRA2
15007	SLC17A6	HGNC:16703; Q9P2U8
15008	SLC17A7	HGNC:16704; Q9P2U7
15009	SLC17A8	HGNC:20151; Q8NDX2
15010	SLC17A9	HGNC:16192; Q9BYT1
15011	SLC18A1	HGNC:10934; P54219
15012	SLC18A2	HGNC:10935; Q05940
15013	SLC18A3	HGNC:10936; Q16572
15014	SLC18B1	HGNC:21573; Q6NT16
15015	SLC19A1	HGNC:10937; P41440
15016	SLC19A2	HGNC:10938; O60779
15017	SLC19A3	HGNC:16266; Q9BZV2
15018	SLC20A1	HGNC:10946; Q8WUM9
15019	SLC20A2	HGNC:10947; Q08357
15020	SLC22A1	HGNC:10963; O15245
15021	SLC22A2	HGNC:10966; O15244
15022	SLC22A3	HGNC:10967; O75751
15023	SLC22A4	HGNC:10968; Q9H015
15024	SLC22A5	HGNC:10969; O76082
15025	SLC22A6	HGNC:10970; Q4U2R8
15026	SLC22A7	HGNC:10971; Q9Y694
15027	SLC22A8	HGNC:10972; Q8TCC7
15028	SLC22A9	HGNC:16261; Q8IVM8
15029	SLC22A10	HGNC:18057; Q63ZE4
15030	SLC22A11	HGNC:18120; Q9NSA0
15031	SLC22A12	HGNC:17989; Q96S37
15032	SLC22A13	HGNC:8494; Q9Y226
15033	SLC22A14	HGNC:8495; Q9Y267
15034	SLC22A15	HGNC:20301; Q8IZD6
15035	SLC22A16	HGNC:20302; Q86VW1
15036	SLC22A17	HGNC:23095; Q8WUG5
15037	SLC22A23	HGNC:21106; A1A5C7
15038	SLC22A24	HGNC:28542; Q8N4F4
15039	SLC22A25	HGNC:32935; Q6T423
15040	SLC22A31	HGNC:27091; A6NKX4
15041	SLC23A1	HGNC:10974; Q9UHI7
15042	SLC23A2	HGNC:10973; Q9UGH3
15043	SLC23A3	HGNC:20601; Q6PIS1
15044	SLC24A1	HGNC:10975; O60721
15045	SLC24A2	HGNC:10976; Q9UI40
15046	SLC24A3	HGNC:10977; Q9HC58
15047	SLC24A4	HGNC:10978; Q8NFF2
15048	SLC24A5	HGNC:20611; Q71RS6
15049	SLC25A1	HGNC:10979; P53007
15050	SLC25A2	HGNC:22921; Q9BXI2
15051	SLC25A3	HGNC:10989; Q00325
15052	SLC25A4	HGNC:10990; P12235
15053	SLC25A5	HGNC:10991; P05141
15054	SLC25A6	HGNC:10992; P12236
15055	SLC25A10	HGNC:10980; Q9UBX3
15056	SLC25A11	HGNC:10981; Q02978
15057	SLC25A12	HGNC:10982; O75746
15058	SLC25A13	HGNC:10983; Q9UJS0
15059	SLC25A14	HGNC:10984; O95258
15060	SLC25A15	HGNC:10985; Q9Y619
15061	SLC25A16	HGNC:10986; P16260
15062	SLC25A17	HGNC:10987; O43808
15063	SLC25A18	HGNC:10988; Q9H1K4
15064	SLC25A19	HGNC:14409; Q9HC21
15065	SLC25A20	HGNC:1421; O43772
15066	SLC25A21	HGNC:14411; Q9BQT8
15067	SLC25A22	HGNC:19954; Q9H936
15068	SLC25A23	HGNC:19375; Q9BV35
15069	SLC25A24	HGNC:20662; Q6NUK1
15070	SLC25A25	HGNC:20663; Q6KCM7
15071	SLC25A26	HGNC:20661; Q70HW3
15072	SLC25A27	HGNC:21065; O95847
15073	SLC25A28	HGNC:23472; Q96A46
15074	SLC25A29	HGNC:20116; Q8N8R3
15075	SLC25A30	HGNC:27371; Q5SVS4
15076	SLC25A31	HGNC:25319; Q9H0C2
15077	SLC25A32	HGNC:29683; Q9H2D1
15078	SLC25A33	HGNC:29681; Q9BSK2
15079	SLC25A34	HGNC:27653; Q6PIV7
15080	SLC25A35	HGNC:31921; Q3KQZ1
15081	SLC25A36	HGNC:25554; Q96CQ1
15082	SLC25A37	HGNC:29786; Q9NYZ2
15083	SLC25A38	HGNC:26054; Q96DW6
15084	SLC25A39	HGNC:24279; Q9BZJ4
15085	SLC25A40	HGNC:29680; Q8TBP6
15086	SLC25A41	HGNC:28533; Q8N5S1
15087	SLC25A42	HGNC:28380; Q86VD7
15088	SLC25A43	HGNC:30557; Q8WUT9
15089	SLC25A44	HGNC:29036; Q96H78
15090	SLC25A45	HGNC:27442; Q8N413
15091	SLC25A46	HGNC:25198; Q96AG3
15092	SLC25A47	HGNC:20115; Q6Q0C1
15093	SLC25A48	HGNC:30451; Q6ZT89
15094	SLC25A51	HGNC:23323; Q9H1U9
15095	SLC25A52	HGNC:23324; Q3SY17
15096	SLC25A53	HGNC:31894; Q5H9E4
15097	SLC26A1	HGNC:10993; Q9H2B4
15098	SLC26A2	HGNC:10994; P50443
15099	SLC26A3	HGNC:3018; P40879
15100	SLC26A4	HGNC:8818; O43511
15101	SLC26A5	HGNC:9359; P58743
15102	SLC26A6	HGNC:14472; Q9BXS9
15103	SLC26A7	HGNC:14467; Q8TE54
15104	SLC26A8	HGNC:14468; Q96RN1
15105	SLC26A9	HGNC:14469; Q7LBE3
15106	SLC26A11	HGNC:14471; Q86WA9
15107	SLC27A1	HGNC:10995; Q6PCB7
15108	SLC27A2	HGNC:10996; O14975
15109	SLC27A3	HGNC:10997; Q5K4L6
15110	SLC27A4	HGNC:10998; Q6P1M0
15111	SLC27A5	HGNC:10999; Q9Y2P5
15112	SLC27A6	HGNC:11000; Q9Y2P4
15113	SLC28A1	HGNC:11001; O00337
15114	SLC28A2	HGNC:11002; O43868
15115	SLC28A3	HGNC:16484; Q9HAS3
15116	SLC29A1	HGNC:11003; Q99808
15117	SLC29A2	HGNC:11004; Q14542
15118	SLC29A3	HGNC:23096; Q9BZD2
15119	SLC29A4	HGNC:23097; Q7RTT9
15120	SLC30A1	HGNC:11012; Q9Y6M5
15121	SLC30A2	HGNC:11013; Q9BRI3
15122	SLC30A3	HGNC:11014; Q99726
15123	SLC30A4	HGNC:11015; O14863
15124	SLC30A5	HGNC:19089; Q8TAD4
15125	SLC30A6	HGNC:19305; Q6NXT4
15126	SLC30A7	HGNC:19306; Q8NEW0
15127	SLC30A8	HGNC:20303; Q8IWU4
15128	SLC30A9	HGNC:1329; Q6PML9
15129	SLC30A10	HGNC:25355; Q6XR72
15130	SLC31A1	HGNC:11016; O15431
15131	SLC31A2	HGNC:11017; O15432
15132	SLC32A1	HGNC:11018; Q9H598
15133	SLC33A1	HGNC:95; O00400
15134	SLC33A2	HGNC:25157; Q96ES6
15135	SLC34A1	HGNC:11019; Q06495
15136	SLC34A2	HGNC:11020; O95436
15137	SLC34A3	HGNC:20305; Q8N130
15138	SLC35A1	HGNC:11021; P78382
15139	SLC35A2	HGNC:11022; P78381
15140	SLC35A3	HGNC:11023; Q9Y2D2
15141	SLC35A4	HGNC:20753; L0R6Q1, Q96G79
15142	SLC35A5	HGNC:20792; Q9BS91
15143	SLC35B1	HGNC:20798; P78383
15144	SLC35B2	HGNC:16872; Q8TB61
15145	SLC35B3	HGNC:21601; Q9H1N7
15146	SLC35B4	HGNC:20584; Q969S0
15147	SLC35C1	HGNC:20197; Q96A29
15148	SLC35D1	HGNC:20800; Q9NTN3
15149	SLC35D2	HGNC:20799; Q76EJ3
15150	SLC35D3	HGNC:15621; Q5M8T2
15151	SLC35D4	HGNC:31723; Q24JQ0
15152	SLC35E1	HGNC:20803; Q96K37
15153	SLC35E2B	HGNC:33941; P0CK96
15154	SLC35E3	HGNC:20864; Q7Z769
15155	SLC35E4	HGNC:17058; Q6ICL7
15156	SLC35F1	HGNC:21483; Q5T1Q4
15157	SLC35F2	HGNC:23615; Q8IXU6
15158	SLC35F3	HGNC:23616; Q8IY50
15159	SLC35F4	HGNC:19845; A4IF30
15160	SLC35F5	HGNC:23617; Q8WV83
15161	SLC35F6	HGNC:26055; Q8N357
15162	SLC35G1	HGNC:26607; Q2M3R5
15163	SLC35G2	HGNC:28480; Q8TBE7
15164	SLC35G3	HGNC:26848; Q8N808
15165	SLC35G4	HGNC:31043; P0C7Q5
15166	SLC35G5	HGNC:15546; Q96KT7
15167	SLC35G6	HGNC:31351; P0C7Q6
15168	SLC35H1	HGNC:17117; Q9NQQ7
15169	SLC36A1	HGNC:18761; Q7Z2H8
15170	SLC36A2	HGNC:18762; Q495M3
15171	SLC36A3	HGNC:19659; Q495N2
15172	SLC36A4	HGNC:19660; Q6YBV0
15173	SLC37A1	HGNC:11024; P57057
15174	SLC37A2	HGNC:20644; Q8TED4
15175	SLC37A3	HGNC:20651; Q8NCC5
15176	SLC37A4	HGNC:4061; O43826
15177	SLC38A1	HGNC:13447; Q9H2H9
15178	SLC38A2	HGNC:13448; Q96QD8
15179	SLC38A3	HGNC:18044; Q99624
15180	SLC38A4	HGNC:14679; Q969I6
15181	SLC38A5	HGNC:18070; Q8WUX1
15182	SLC38A6	HGNC:19863; Q8IZM9
15183	SLC38A7	HGNC:25582; Q9NVC3
15184	SLC38A8	HGNC:32434; A6NNN8
15185	SLC38A9	HGNC:26907; Q8NBW4
15186	SLC38A10	HGNC:28237; Q9HBR0
15187	SLC38A11	HGNC:26836; Q08AI6
15188	SLC38A12	HGNC:25984; Q8NE00
15189	SLC39A1	HGNC:12876; Q9NY26
15190	SLC39A2	HGNC:17127; Q9NP94
15191	SLC39A3	HGNC:17128; Q9BRY0
15192	SLC39A4	HGNC:17129; Q6P5W5
15193	SLC39A5	HGNC:20502; Q6ZMH5
15194	SLC39A6	HGNC:18607; Q13433
15195	SLC39A7	HGNC:4927; Q92504
15196	SLC39A8	HGNC:20862; Q9C0K1
15197	SLC39A9	HGNC:20182; Q9NUM3
15198	SLC39A10	HGNC:20861; Q9ULF5
15199	SLC39A11	HGNC:14463; Q8N1S5
15200	SLC39A12	HGNC:20860; Q504Y0
15201	SLC39A13	HGNC:20859; Q96H72
15202	SLC39A14	HGNC:20858; Q15043
15203	SLC40A1	HGNC:10909; Q9NP59
15204	SLC41A1	HGNC:19429; Q8IVJ1
15205	SLC41A2	HGNC:31045; Q96JW4
15206	SLC41A3	HGNC:31046; Q96GZ6
15207	SLC43A1	HGNC:9225; O75387
15208	SLC43A2	HGNC:23087; Q8N370
15209	SLC43A3	HGNC:17466; Q8NBI5
15210	SLC44A1	HGNC:18798; Q8WWI5
15211	SLC44A2	HGNC:17292; Q8IWA5
15212	SLC44A3	HGNC:28689; Q8N4M1
15213	SLC44A4	HGNC:13941; Q53GD3
15214	SLC44A5	HGNC:28524; Q8NCS7
15215	SLC45A1	HGNC:17939; Q9Y2W3
15216	SLC45A2	HGNC:16472; Q9UMX9
15217	SLC45A3	HGNC:8642; Q96JT2
15218	SLC45A4	HGNC:29196; Q5BKX6
15219	SLC46A1	HGNC:30521; Q96NT5
15220	SLC46A2	HGNC:16055; Q9BY10
15221	SLC46A3	HGNC:27501; Q7Z3Q1
15222	SLC47A1	HGNC:25588; Q96FL8
15223	SLC47A2	HGNC:26439; Q86VL8
15224	SLC48A1	HGNC:26035; Q6P1K1
15225	SLC49A3	HGNC:26177; Q6UXD7
15226	SLC49A4	HGNC:16628; Q96SL1
15227	SLC50A1	HGNC:30657; Q9BRV3
15228	SLC51A	HGNC:29955; Q86UW1
15229	SLC51B	HGNC:29956; Q86UW2
15230	SLC52A1	HGNC:30225; Q9NWF4
15231	SLC52A2	HGNC:30224; Q9HAB3
15232	SLC52A3	HGNC:16187; Q9NQ40
15233	SLC60A1	HGNC:25433; Q8N468
15234	SLC60A2	HGNC:21053; Q5TF39
15235	SLC61A1	HGNC:28156; Q6N075
15236	SLC66A1	HGNC:26001; Q6ZP29
15237	SLC66A2	HGNC:26188; Q8N2U9
15238	SLC66A3	HGNC:28503; Q8N755
15239	SLC67A1	HGNC:10964; Q96BI1
15240	SLC67A2	HGNC:28158; Q8NBP5
15241	SLC68A1	HGNC:26196; Q14CX5
15242	SLC71A1	HGNC:23363; Q96MC6
15243	SLC71A2	HGNC:23376; Q5SR56
15244	SLC75A1	HGNC:16894; Q14728
15245	SLCO1A2	HGNC:10956; P46721
15246	SLCO1B1	HGNC:10959; Q9Y6L6
15247	SLCO1B3	HGNC:10961; Q9NPD5
15248	SLCO1B7	HGNC:32934; G3V0H7
15249	SLCO1C1	HGNC:13819; Q9NYB5
15250	SLCO2A1	HGNC:10955; Q92959
15251	SLCO2B1	HGNC:10962; O94956
15252	SLCO3A1	HGNC:10952; Q9UIG8
15253	SLCO4A1	HGNC:10953; Q96BD0
15254	SLCO4C1	HGNC:23612; Q6ZQN7
15255	SLCO5A1	HGNC:19046; Q9H2Y9
15256	SLCO6A1	HGNC:23613; Q86UG4
15257	SLF1	HGNC:25408; Q9BQI6
15258	SLF2	HGNC:17814; Q8IX21
15259	SLFN5	HGNC:28286; Q08AF3
15260	SLFN11	HGNC:26633; Q7Z7L1
15261	SLFN12	HGNC:25500; Q8IYM2
15262	SLFN12L	HGNC:33920; Q6IEE8
15263	SLFN13	HGNC:26481; Q68D06
15264	SLFN14	HGNC:32689; P0C7P3
15265	SLFNL1	HGNC:26313; Q499Z3
15266	SLIRP	HGNC:20495; Q9GZT3
15267	SLIT1	HGNC:11085; O75093
15268	SLIT2	HGNC:11086; O94813
15269	SLIT3	HGNC:11087; O75094
15270	SLITRK1	HGNC:20297; Q96PX8
15271	SLITRK2	HGNC:13449; Q9H156
15272	SLITRK3	HGNC:23501; O94933
15273	SLITRK4	HGNC:23502; Q8IW52
15274	SLITRK5	HGNC:20295; O94991
15275	SLITRK6	HGNC:23503; Q9H5Y7
15276	SLK	HGNC:11088; Q9H2G2
15277	SLMAP	HGNC:16643; Q14BN4
15278	SLN	HGNC:11089; O00631
15279	SLPI	HGNC:11092; P03973
15280	SLTM	HGNC:20709; Q9NWH9
15281	SLU7	HGNC:16939; O95391
15282	SLURP1	HGNC:18746; P55000
15283	SLURP2	HGNC:25549; P0DP57
15284	SLX1A	HGNC:20922; Q9BQ83
15285	SLX1B	HGNC:28748; Q9BQ83
15286	SLX4	HGNC:23845; Q8IY92
15287	SLX4IP	HGNC:16225; Q5VYV7
15288	SLX9	HGNC:15811; Q9NSI2
15289	SMAD1	HGNC:6767; Q15797
15290	SMAD2	HGNC:6768; Q15796
15291	SMAD3	HGNC:6769; P84022
15292	SMAD4	HGNC:6770; Q13485
15293	SMAD5	HGNC:6771; Q99717
15294	SMAD6	HGNC:6772; O43541
15295	SMAD7	HGNC:6773; O15105
15296	SMAD9	HGNC:6774; O15198
15297	SMAGP	HGNC:26918; Q0VAQ4
15298	SMAP1	HGNC:19651; Q8IYB5
15299	SMAP2	HGNC:25082; Q8WU79
15300	SMARCA1	HGNC:11097; P28370
15301	SMARCA2	HGNC:11098; P51531
15302	SMARCA4	HGNC:11100; P51532
15303	SMARCA5	HGNC:11101; O60264
15304	SMARCAD1	HGNC:18398; Q9H4L7
15305	SMARCAL1	HGNC:11102; Q9NZC9
15306	SMARCB1	HGNC:11103; Q12824
15307	SMARCC1	HGNC:11104; Q92922
15308	SMARCC2	HGNC:11105; Q8TAQ2
15309	SMARCD1	HGNC:11106; Q96GM5
15310	SMARCD2	HGNC:11107; Q92925
15311	SMARCD3	HGNC:11108; Q6STE5
15312	SMARCE1	HGNC:11109; Q969G3
15313	SMC1A	HGNC:11111; Q14683
15314	SMC1B	HGNC:11112; Q8NDV3
15315	SMC2	HGNC:14011; O95347
15316	SMC3	HGNC:2468; Q9UQE7
15317	SMC4	HGNC:14013; Q9NTJ3
15318	SMC5	HGNC:20465; Q8IY18
15319	SMC6	HGNC:20466; Q96SB8
15320	SMCHD1	HGNC:29090; A6NHR9
15321	SMCO1	HGNC:27407; Q147U7
15322	SMCO2	HGNC:34448; A6NFE2
15323	SMCO3	HGNC:34401; A2RU48
15324	SMCO4	HGNC:24810; Q9NRQ5
15325	SMCP	HGNC:6962; P49901
15326	SMCR8	HGNC:17921; Q8TEV9
15327	SMDT1	HGNC:25055; Q9H4I9
15328	SMG1	HGNC:30045; Q96Q15
15329	SMG5	HGNC:24644; Q9UPR3
15330	SMG6	HGNC:17809; Q86US8
15331	SMG7	HGNC:16792; Q92540
15332	SMG8	HGNC:25551; Q8ND04
15333	SMG9	HGNC:25763; Q9H0W8
15334	SMIM1	HGNC:44204; B2RUZ4
15335	SMIM2	HGNC:28776; Q9BVW6
15336	SMIM3	HGNC:30248; Q9BZL3
15337	SMIM5	HGNC:40030; Q71RC9
15338	SMIM7	HGNC:28419; Q9BQ49
15339	SMIM8	HGNC:21401; Q96KF7
15340	SMIM9	HGNC:41915; A6NGZ8
15341	SMIM10	HGNC:41913; Q96HG1
15342	SMIM10L1	HGNC:49847; P0DMW3
15343	SMIM10L2A	HGNC:34499; P0DMW4
15344	SMIM10L2B	HGNC:34500; P0DMW5
15345	SMIM10L3	HGNC:56768; A0A0C4DGP1
15346	SMIM11	HGNC:1293; P58511
15347	SMIM12	HGNC:25154; Q96EX1
15348	SMIM13	HGNC:27356; P0DJ93
15349	SMIM14	HGNC:27321; Q96QK8
15350	SMIM15	HGNC:33861; Q7Z3B0
15351	SMIM17	HGNC:27114; P0DL12
15352	SMIM18	HGNC:42973; P0DKX4
15353	SMIM19	HGNC:25166; Q96E16
15354	SMIM20	HGNC:37260; Q8N5G0
15355	SMIM21	HGNC:27598; Q3B7S5
15356	SMIM22	HGNC:48329; K7EJ46
15357	SMIM23	HGNC:34440; A6NLE4
15358	SMIM24	HGNC:37244; O75264
15359	SMIM26	HGNC:43430; A0A096LP01
15360	SMIM27	HGNC:31420; A0A1B0GUW7
15361	SMIM28	HGNC:53434; A0A1B0GU29
15362	SMIM29	HGNC:1340; Q86T20
15363	SMIM30	HGNC:48953; A4D0T7
15364	SMIM31	HGNC:49638; A0A1B0GVY4
15365	SMIM32	HGNC:53640; A0A1B0GUA5
15366	SMIM33	HGNC:53645; A0A1B0GW64
15367	SMIM34	HGNC:39601; A8MWV9
15368	SMIM35	HGNC:44179; A0A1B0GVV1
15369	SMIM36	HGNC:53654; A0A1B0GVT2
15370	SMIM38	HGNC:54074; A0A286YFK9
15371	SMIM39	HGNC:54076; A0A1B0GW54
15372	SMIM40	HGNC:54073; Q5STR5
15373	SMIM41	HGNC:54075; A0A2R8YCJ5
15374	SMIM42	HGNC:55000; A0A5F9ZH02
15375	SMIM43	HGNC:55077; Q4W5P6
15376	SMIM44	HGNC:55815; A0A286YF18
15377	SMIM45	HGNC:27930; A0A590UK83
15378	SMIM46	HGNC:56307; P0DQW1
15379	SMIM47	HGNC:53452; D0EPY3
15380	SMIM48	HGNC:58752
15381	SMKR1	HGNC:43561; H3BMG3
15382	SMLR1	HGNC:44670; H3BR10
15383	SMN1	HGNC:11117; Q16637
15384	SMN2	HGNC:11118; Q16637
15385	SMNDC1	HGNC:16900; O75940
15386	SMO	HGNC:11119; Q99835
15387	SMOC1	HGNC:20318; Q9H4F8
15388	SMOC2	HGNC:20323; Q9H3U7
15389	SMOX	HGNC:15862; Q9NWM0
15390	SMPD1	HGNC:11120; P17405
15391	SMPD2	HGNC:11121; O60906
15392	SMPD3	HGNC:14240; Q9NY59
15393	SMPD4	HGNC:32949; Q9NXE4
15394	SMPDL3A	HGNC:17389; Q92484
15395	SMPDL3B	HGNC:21416; Q92485
15396	SMPX	HGNC:11122; Q9UHP9
15397	SMR3A	HGNC:19216; Q99954
15398	SMR3B	HGNC:17326; P02814
15399	SMS	HGNC:11123; P52788
15400	SMTN	HGNC:11126; P53814
15401	SMTNL1	HGNC:32394; A8MU46
15402	SMTNL2	HGNC:24764; Q2TAL5
15403	SMU1	HGNC:18247; Q2TAY7
15404	SMUG1	HGNC:17148; Q53HV7
15405	SMURF1	HGNC:16807; Q9HCE7
15406	SMURF2	HGNC:16809; Q9HAU4
15407	SMYD1	HGNC:20986; Q8NB12
15408	SMYD2	HGNC:20982; Q9NRG4
15409	SMYD3	HGNC:15513; Q9H7B4
15410	SMYD4	HGNC:21067; Q8IYR2
15411	SMYD5	HGNC:16258; Q6GMV2
15412	SNAI1	HGNC:11128; O95863
15413	SNAI2	HGNC:11094; O43623
15414	SNAI3	HGNC:18411; Q3KNW1
15415	SNAP23	HGNC:11131; O00161
15416	SNAP25	HGNC:11132; P60880
15417	SNAP29	HGNC:11133; O95721
15418	SNAP47	HGNC:30669; Q5SQN1
15419	SNAP91	HGNC:14986; O60641
15420	SNAPC1	HGNC:11134; Q16533
15421	SNAPC2	HGNC:11135; Q13487
15422	SNAPC3	HGNC:11136; Q92966
15423	SNAPC4	HGNC:11137; Q5SXM2
15424	SNAPC5	HGNC:15484; O75971
15425	SNAPIN	HGNC:17145; O95295
15426	SNCA	HGNC:11138; P37840
15427	SNCAIP	HGNC:11139; Q9Y6H5
15428	SNCB	HGNC:11140; Q16143
15429	SNCG	HGNC:11141; O76070
15430	SND1	HGNC:30646; Q7KZF4
15431	SNED1	HGNC:24696; Q8TER0
15432	SNF8	HGNC:17028; Q96H20
15433	SNIP1	HGNC:30587; Q8TAD8
15434	SNN	HGNC:11149; O75324
15435	SNORC	HGNC:33763; Q6UX34
15436	SNPH	HGNC:15931; O15079
15437	SNRK	HGNC:30598; Q9NRH2
15438	SNRNP25	HGNC:14161; Q9BV90
15439	SNRNP27	HGNC:30240; Q8WVK2
15440	SNRNP35	HGNC:30852; Q16560
15441	SNRNP40	HGNC:30857; Q96DI7
15442	SNRNP48	HGNC:21368; Q6IEG0
15443	SNRNP70	HGNC:11150; P08621
15444	SNRNP200	HGNC:30859; O75643
15445	SNRPA	HGNC:11151; P09012
15446	SNRPA1	HGNC:11152; P09661
15447	SNRPB	HGNC:11153; P14678
15448	SNRPB2	HGNC:11155; P08579
15449	SNRPC	HGNC:11157; P09234
15450	SNRPD1	HGNC:11158; P62314
15451	SNRPD2	HGNC:11159; P62316
15452	SNRPD3	HGNC:11160; P62318
15453	SNRPE	HGNC:11161; P62304
15454	SNRPF	HGNC:11162; P62306
15455	SNRPG	HGNC:11163; P62308
15456	SNRPN	HGNC:11164; P63162
15457	SNTA1	HGNC:11167; Q13424
15458	SNTB1	HGNC:11168; Q13884
15459	SNTB2	HGNC:11169; Q13425
15460	SNTG1	HGNC:13740; Q9NSN8
15461	SNTG2	HGNC:13741; Q9NY99
15462	SNTN	HGNC:33706; A6NMZ2
15463	SNU13	HGNC:7819; P55769
15464	SNUPN	HGNC:14245; O95149
15465	SNURF	HGNC:11171; Q9Y675
15466	SNW1	HGNC:16696; Q13573
15467	SNX1	HGNC:11172; Q13596
15468	SNX2	HGNC:11173; O60749
15469	SNX3	HGNC:11174; O60493
15470	SNX4	HGNC:11175; O95219
15471	SNX5	HGNC:14969; Q9Y5X3
15472	SNX6	HGNC:14970; Q9UNH7
15473	SNX7	HGNC:14971; Q9UNH6
15474	SNX8	HGNC:14972; Q9Y5X2
15475	SNX9	HGNC:14973; Q9Y5X1
15476	SNX10	HGNC:14974; Q9Y5X0
15477	SNX11	HGNC:14975; Q9Y5W9
15478	SNX12	HGNC:14976; Q9UMY4
15479	SNX13	HGNC:21335; Q9Y5W8
15480	SNX14	HGNC:14977; Q9Y5W7
15481	SNX15	HGNC:14978; Q9NRS6
15482	SNX16	HGNC:14980; P57768
15483	SNX17	HGNC:14979; Q15036
15484	SNX18	HGNC:19245; Q96RF0
15485	SNX19	HGNC:21532; Q92543
15486	SNX20	HGNC:30390; Q7Z614
15487	SNX21	HGNC:16154; Q969T3
15488	SNX22	HGNC:16315; Q96L94
15489	SNX24	HGNC:21533; Q9Y343
15490	SNX25	HGNC:21883; Q9H3E2
15491	SNX27	HGNC:20073; Q96L92
15492	SNX29	HGNC:30542; Q8TEQ0
15493	SNX30	HGNC:23685; Q5VWJ9
15494	SNX31	HGNC:28605; Q8N9S9
15495	SNX32	HGNC:26423; Q86XE0
15496	SNX33	HGNC:28468; Q8WV41
15497	SOAT1	HGNC:11177; P35610
15498	SOAT2	HGNC:11178; O75908
15499	SOBP	HGNC:29256; A7XYQ1
15500	SOCS1	HGNC:19383; O15524
15501	SOCS2	HGNC:19382; O14508
15502	SOCS3	HGNC:19391; O14543
15503	SOCS4	HGNC:19392; Q8WXH5
15504	SOCS5	HGNC:16852; O75159
15505	SOCS6	HGNC:16833; O14544
15506	SOCS7	HGNC:29846; O14512
15507	SOD1	HGNC:11179; P00441
15508	SOD2	HGNC:11180; P04179
15509	SOD3	HGNC:11181; P08294
15510	SOHLH1	HGNC:27845; Q5JUK2
15511	SOHLH2	HGNC:26026; Q9NX45
15512	SON	HGNC:11183; P18583
15513	SORBS1	HGNC:14565; Q9BX66
15514	SORBS2	HGNC:24098; O94875
15515	SORBS3	HGNC:30907; O60504
15516	SORCS1	HGNC:16697; Q8WY21
15517	SORCS2	HGNC:16698; Q96PQ0
15518	SORCS3	HGNC:16699; Q9UPU3
15519	SORD	HGNC:11184; Q00796
15520	SORL1	HGNC:11185; Q92673
15521	SORT1	HGNC:11186; Q99523
15522	SOS1	HGNC:11187; Q07889
15523	SOS2	HGNC:11188; Q07890
15524	SOST	HGNC:13771; Q9BQB4
15525	SOSTDC1	HGNC:21748; Q6X4U4
15526	SOWAHA	HGNC:27033; Q2M3V2
15527	SOWAHB	HGNC:32958; A6NEL2
15528	SOWAHC	HGNC:26149; Q53LP3
15529	SOWAHD	HGNC:32960; A6NJG2
15530	SOX1	HGNC:11189; O00570
15531	SOX2	HGNC:11195; P48431
15532	SOX3	HGNC:11199; P41225
15533	SOX4	HGNC:11200; Q06945
15534	SOX5	HGNC:11201; P35711
15535	SOX6	HGNC:16421; P35712
15536	SOX7	HGNC:18196; Q9BT81
15537	SOX8	HGNC:11203; P57073
15538	SOX9	HGNC:11204; P48436
15539	SOX10	HGNC:11190; P56693
15540	SOX11	HGNC:11191; P35716
15541	SOX12	HGNC:11198; O15370
15542	SOX13	HGNC:11192; Q9UN79
15543	SOX14	HGNC:11193; O95416
15544	SOX15	HGNC:11196; O60248
15545	SOX17	HGNC:18122; Q9H6I2
15546	SOX18	HGNC:11194; P35713
15547	SOX21	HGNC:11197; Q9Y651
15548	SOX30	HGNC:30635; O94993
15549	SP1	HGNC:11205; P08047
15550	SP2	HGNC:11207; Q02086
15551	SP3	HGNC:11208; Q02447
15552	SP4	HGNC:11209; Q02446
15553	SP5	HGNC:14529; Q6BEB4
15554	SP6	HGNC:14530; Q3SY56
15555	SP7	HGNC:17321; Q8TDD2
15556	SP8	HGNC:19196; Q8IXZ3
15557	SP9	HGNC:30690; P0CG40
15558	SP100	HGNC:11206; P23497
15559	SP110	HGNC:5401; Q9HB58
15560	SP140	HGNC:17133; Q13342
15561	SP140L	HGNC:25105; Q9H930
15562	SPA17	HGNC:11210; Q15506
15563	SPAAR	HGNC:27244; A0A1B0GVQ0
15564	SPACA1	HGNC:14967; Q9HBV2
15565	SPACA3	HGNC:16260; Q8IXA5
15566	SPACA4	HGNC:16441; Q8TDM5
15567	SPACA5	HGNC:31353; Q96QH8
15568	SPACA5B	HGNC:19142; Q96QH8
15569	SPACA6	HGNC:27113; W5XKT8
15570	SPACA7	HGNC:29575; Q96KW9
15571	SPACA9	HGNC:1367; Q96E40
15572	SPACDR	HGNC:22135; Q8IZ16
15573	SPADH	HGNC:55808; A0A494C103
15574	SPAG1	HGNC:11212; Q07617
15575	SPAG4	HGNC:11214; Q9NPE6
15576	SPAG5	HGNC:13452; Q96R06
15577	SPAG6	HGNC:11215; O75602
15578	SPAG7	HGNC:11216; O75391
15579	SPAG8	HGNC:14105; Q99932
15580	SPAG9	HGNC:14524; O60271
15581	SPAG11A	HGNC:33342; Q6PDA7
15582	SPAG11B	HGNC:14534; Q08648
15583	SPAG16	HGNC:23225; Q8N0X2
15584	SPAG17	HGNC:26620; Q6Q759
15585	SPAM1	HGNC:11217; P38567
15586	SPANXA1	HGNC:11218; Q9NS26
15587	SPANXA2	HGNC:14328; Q9NS26
15588	SPANXB1	HGNC:14329; Q9NS25
15589	SPANXC	HGNC:14331; Q9NY87
15590	SPANXD	HGNC:14332; Q9BXN6
15591	SPANXN1	HGNC:33174; Q5VSR9
15592	SPANXN2	HGNC:33175; Q5MJ10
15593	SPANXN3	HGNC:33176; Q5MJ09
15594	SPANXN4	HGNC:33177; Q5MJ08
15595	SPANXN5	HGNC:33178; Q5MJ07
15596	SPARC	HGNC:11219; P09486
15597	SPARCL1	HGNC:11220; Q14515
15598	SPART	HGNC:18514; Q8N0X7
15599	SPAST	HGNC:11233; Q9UBP0
15600	SPATA1	HGNC:14682; Q5VX52
15601	SPATA2	HGNC:14681; Q9UM82
15602	SPATA2L	HGNC:28393; Q8IUW3
15603	SPATA3	HGNC:17884; Q8NHX4
15604	SPATA4	HGNC:17333; Q8NEY3
15605	SPATA6	HGNC:18309; Q9NWH7
15606	SPATA6L	HGNC:25472; Q8N4H0
15607	SPATA7	HGNC:20423; Q9P0W8
15608	SPATA9	HGNC:22988; Q9BWV2
15609	SPATA12	HGNC:23221; Q7Z6I5
15610	SPATA13	HGNC:23222; Q96N96
15611	SPATA16	HGNC:29935; Q9BXB7
15612	SPATA17	HGNC:25184; Q96L03
15613	SPATA18	HGNC:29579; Q8TC71
15614	SPATA19	HGNC:30614; Q7Z5L4
15615	SPATA20	HGNC:26125; Q8TB22
15616	SPATA21	HGNC:28026; Q7Z572
15617	SPATA22	HGNC:30705; Q8NHS9
15618	SPATA24	HGNC:27322; Q86W54
15619	SPATA25	HGNC:16158; Q9BR10
15620	SPATA31A1	HGNC:23394; Q5TZJ5
15621	SPATA31A3	HGNC:32003; Q5VYP0
15622	SPATA31A5	HGNC:32005; Q5VU36
15623	SPATA31A6	HGNC:32006; Q5VVP1
15624	SPATA31A7	HGNC:32007; Q8IWB4
15625	SPATA31C1	HGNC:27846; P0DKV0
15626	SPATA31C2	HGNC:24508; B4DYI2
15627	SPATA31D1	HGNC:37283; Q6ZQQ2
15628	SPATA31D3	HGNC:38603; P0C874
15629	SPATA31D4	HGNC:38601; Q6ZUB0
15630	SPATA31E1	HGNC:26672; Q6ZUB1
15631	SPATA31F1	HGNC:41911; Q6ZU69
15632	SPATA31F3	HGNC:42673; A6NFA0
15633	SPATA31G1	HGNC:31418; Q5VYM1
15634	SPATA31H1	HGNC:25275; Q68DN1
15635	SPATA32	HGNC:26349; Q96LK8
15636	SPATA33	HGNC:26463; Q96N06
15637	SPATA45	HGNC:33709; Q537H7
15638	SPATA46	HGNC:27648; Q5T0L3
15639	SPATC1	HGNC:30510; Q76KD6
15640	SPATC1L	HGNC:1298; Q9H0A9
15641	SPATS1	HGNC:22957; Q496A3
15642	SPATS2	HGNC:18650; Q86XZ4
15643	SPATS2L	HGNC:24574; Q9NUQ6
15644	SPC24	HGNC:26913; Q8NBT2
15645	SPC25	HGNC:24031; Q9HBM1
15646	SPCS1	HGNC:23401; Q9Y6A9
15647	SPCS2	HGNC:28962; Q15005
15648	SPCS3	HGNC:26212; P61009
15649	SPDEF	HGNC:17257; O95238
15650	SPDL1	HGNC:26010; Q96EA4
15651	SPDYA	HGNC:30613; Q5MJ70
15652	SPDYC	HGNC:32681; Q5MJ68
15653	SPDYE1	HGNC:16408; Q8NFV5
15654	SPDYE2	HGNC:33841; Q495Y8
15655	SPDYE2B	HGNC:48334; A6NHP3
15656	SPDYE3	HGNC:35462; A6NKU9
15657	SPDYE4	HGNC:35463; A6NLX3
15658	SPDYE5	HGNC:35464; A6NIY4
15659	SPDYE6	HGNC:35465; P0CI01
15660	SPDYE8	HGNC:33771; P0DUD1
15661	SPDYE9	HGNC:45034; A0A494C191
15662	SPDYE10	HGNC:51506; P0DUX0
15663	SPDYE11	HGNC:51507; P0DTA3
15664	SPDYE12	HGNC:51508; P0DUX1
15665	SPDYE13	HGNC:51509; A0A494C0Z2
15666	SPDYE14	HGNC:51510; P0DUD3
15667	SPDYE15	HGNC:51511; P0DUD4
15668	SPDYE16	HGNC:51512; A6NNV3
15669	SPDYE17	HGNC:51513; P0DUD2
15670	SPDYE18	HGNC:51514; P0DV79
15671	SPDYE21	HGNC:51517; A0A494C086
15672	SPECC1	HGNC:30615; Q5M775
15673	SPECC1L	HGNC:29022; Q69YQ0
15674	SPEF1	HGNC:15874; Q9Y4P9
15675	SPEF2	HGNC:26293; Q9C093
15676	SPEG	HGNC:16901; Q15772
15677	SPEGNB	HGNC:51251; A0A087WV53
15678	SPEM1	HGNC:32429; Q8N4L4
15679	SPEM2	HGNC:27315; Q0P670
15680	SPEM3	HGNC:53651; A0A1B0GUW6
15681	SPEN	HGNC:17575; Q96T58
15682	SPESP1	HGNC:15570; Q6UW49
15683	SPG7	HGNC:11237; Q9UQ90
15684	SPG11	HGNC:11226; Q96JI7
15685	SPG21	HGNC:20373; Q9NZD8
15686	SPHK1	HGNC:11240; Q9NYA1
15687	SPHK2	HGNC:18859; Q9NRA0
15688	SPHKAP	HGNC:30619; Q2M3C7
15689	SPI1	HGNC:11241; P17947
15690	SPIB	HGNC:11242; Q01892
15691	SPIC	HGNC:29549; Q8N5J4
15692	SPICE1	HGNC:25083; Q8N0Z3
15693	SPIDR	HGNC:28971; Q14159
15694	SPIN1	HGNC:11243; Q9Y657
15695	SPIN2A	HGNC:20694; Q99865
15696	SPIN2B	HGNC:33147; Q9BPZ2
15697	SPIN3	HGNC:27272; Q5JUX0
15698	SPIN4	HGNC:27040; Q56A73
15699	SPINDOC	HGNC:25115; Q9BUA3
15700	SPINK1	HGNC:11244; P00995
15701	SPINK2	HGNC:11245; P20155
15702	SPINK4	HGNC:16646; O60575
15703	SPINK5	HGNC:15464; Q9NQ38
15704	SPINK6	HGNC:29486; Q6UWN8
15705	SPINK7	HGNC:24643; P58062
15706	SPINK8	HGNC:33160; P0C7L1
15707	SPINK9	HGNC:32951; Q5DT21
15708	SPINK13	HGNC:27200; Q1W4C9
15709	SPINK14	HGNC:33825; Q6IE38
15710	SPINT1	HGNC:11246; O43278
15711	SPINT2	HGNC:11247; O43291
15712	SPINT3	HGNC:11248; P49223
15713	SPINT4	HGNC:16130; Q6UDR6
15714	SPIRE1	HGNC:30622; Q08AE8
15715	SPIRE2	HGNC:30623; Q8WWL2
15716	SPMAP1	HGNC:34492; A8MV24
15717	SPMAP2	HGNC:13706; Q9P2T0
15718	SPMAP2L	HGNC:43771; P0DJG4
15719	SPMIP1	HGNC:52392; A0A1B0GUX0
15720	SPMIP2	HGNC:26342; Q96LM5
15721	SPMIP3	HGNC:30435; Q5SVJ3
15722	SPMIP4	HGNC:21722; Q8N865
15723	SPMIP5	HGNC:28500; Q8WW14
15724	SPMIP6	HGNC:19919; Q8NCR6
15725	SPMIP7	HGNC:22564; A4D263
15726	SPMIP8	HGNC:33745; Q6URK8
15727	SPMIP9	HGNC:26341; Q96LM6
15728	SPMIP10	HGNC:33767; Q6ZNM6
15729	SPMIP11	HGNC:48628; A0A1B0GTD5
15730	SPN	HGNC:11249; P16150
15731	SPNS1	HGNC:30621; Q9H2V7
15732	SPNS2	HGNC:26992; Q8IVW8
15733	SPNS3	HGNC:28433; Q6ZMD2
15734	SPO11	HGNC:11250; Q9Y5K1
15735	SPOCD1	HGNC:26338; Q6ZMY3
15736	SPOCK1	HGNC:11251; Q08629
15737	SPOCK2	HGNC:13564; Q92563
15738	SPOCK3	HGNC:13565; Q9BQ16
15739	SPON1	HGNC:11252; Q9HCB6
15740	SPON2	HGNC:11253; Q9BUD6
15741	SPOP	HGNC:11254; O43791
15742	SPOPL	HGNC:27934; Q6IQ16
15743	SPOUT1	HGNC:26933; Q5T280
15744	SPP1	HGNC:11255; P10451
15745	SPP2	HGNC:11256; Q13103
15746	SPPL2A	HGNC:30227; Q8TCT8
15747	SPPL2B	HGNC:30627; Q8TCT7
15748	SPPL2C	HGNC:28902; Q8IUH8
15749	SPPL3	HGNC:30424; Q8TCT6
15750	SPR	HGNC:11257; P35270
