= Shq1 =

SHQ1

Identifiers
- Aliases: SHQ1, Shq1p, GRIM-1, H/ACA ribonucleoprotein assembly factor, Shq1
- External IDs: OMIM: 613663; MGI: 1919421; GeneCards: SHQ1
Available structures
PDB	Ortholog search: PDBe RCSB
PDB	List of PDB id codes 2MNW, 4PBD, 4PCK

Gene location (Human)
Chr.	Chromosome 3 (human)
Band	3p13	Start	72,749,277 bp
Band	3p13	End	72,861,914 bp

Gene location (Mouse)
Chr.	Chromosome 6 (mouse)
Band	6|6 D3	Start	100,545,217 bp
Band	6|6 D3	End	100,648,118 bp
RNA expression pattern
Bgee	Human / Mouse (ortholog); Top expressed in: sperm; tibia; Epithelium of choroid plexus; germinal epithelium; secondary oocyte; gingival epithelium; cardiac muscle tissue of right atrium; parietal pleura; bronchial epithelial cell; metanephric glomerulus / Top expressed in: hand; otolith organ; spermatid; epiblast; utricle; primitive streak; embryo; embryo; yolk sac; maxillary prominence; More reference expression data
BioGPS	n/a
Gene ontology
Molecular function	protein binding; unfolded protein binding
Cellular component	cytoplasm; Cajal body; nucleolus; nucleus; nucleoplasm; cytosol
Biological process	ribonucleoprotein complex assembly; negative regulation of rRNA processing; positive regulation of telomerase RNA localization to Cajal body; positive regulation of apoptotic process; box H/ACA snoRNP assembly
Sources:Amigo / QuickGO
Orthologs
Databases	NCBI: entry; OMA: entry
Species	Human	Mouse
Entrez	55164	72171
Ensembl	ENSG00000144736	ENSMUSG00000035378
UniProt	Q6PI26	Q7TMX5
RefSeq (mRNA)	NM_018130	NM_181590
RefSeq (protein)	NP_060600	NP_853621
Location (UCSC)	Chr 3: 72.75 – 72.86 Mb	Chr 6: 100.55 – 100.65 Mb
PubMed search
- Wikidata
View/Edit Human	View/Edit Mouse

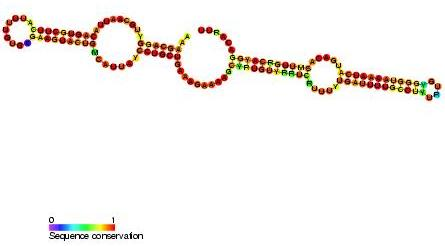
An image of the secondary structure of an H/ACA box snoRNA transcript. This RNA transcript forms a class of protein-RNA complexes called H/ACA box snoRNPs. Shq1p is believed to interact with these snoRNP complexes.

Shq1p is a protein involved in the rRNA processing pathway. It was discovered by Pok Yang in the Chanfreau laboratory at UCLA. Depletion of Shq1p has led to decreased level of various H/ACA box snoRNAs (H/ACA box snoRNAs are responsible for pseuduridylation of pre-rRNA) and certain pre-rRNA intermediates.

== Background ==
During the synthesis of eukaryotic ribosomes, four mature ribosomal RNAs (the 5S, 5.8S, 18S, and 25S) must be synthesized. Three of these rRNAs (5.8S, 18S, and 25S) come from a single pre-rRNA known as the 35S. Although many of the intermediates in this rRNA processing pathway have been identified in the last thirty years, there are still a number of proteins involved in this process whose specific function is unknown.

== Function ==
Shq1, a protein thought to play a role in the stabilization and/or production of box H/ACA snoRNA, is still uncharacterized. It has been proposed that Shq1, along with Naf1p, is involved in the initial steps of the biogenesis of H/ACA box snoRNPs (box H/ACA snoRNAs form complexes with proteins, thereby forming snoRNPs) because of its association with certain snoRNP proteins during the snoRNP’s maturation, while showing very little association with the mature snoRNP complex. Despite the known involvement of Shq1 in H/ACA box snoRNP's production, the exact function of this protein in the overall rRNA processing pathway is still unknown.

== See also ==
- rRNA
- snoRNA
- Ribosomes
- Eukaryotic translation
- Proteins
