= RNPEP =

Protein-coding gene in humans

Identifiers
- Aliases: RNPEP, AP-B, arginyl aminopeptidase, APB
- External IDs: OMIM: 602675; MGI: 2384902; GeneCards: RNPEP
Enzyme activity
| EC # | BRENDA | ExPASy | KEGG | MetaCyc |
|---|---|---|---|---|
| 3.4.11.6 | ↗ | ↗ | ↗ | ↗ |

Gene location (Human)
| Chr. | Chromosome 1 (human) |
| Band | 1q32.1 | Start | 201,982,372 bp |
| Band | 1q32.1 | End | 202,006,147 bp |

Gene location (Mouse)
| Chr. | Chromosome 1 (mouse) |
| Band | 1|1 E4 | Start | 135,190,450 bp |
| Band | 1|1 E4 | End | 135,211,822 bp |
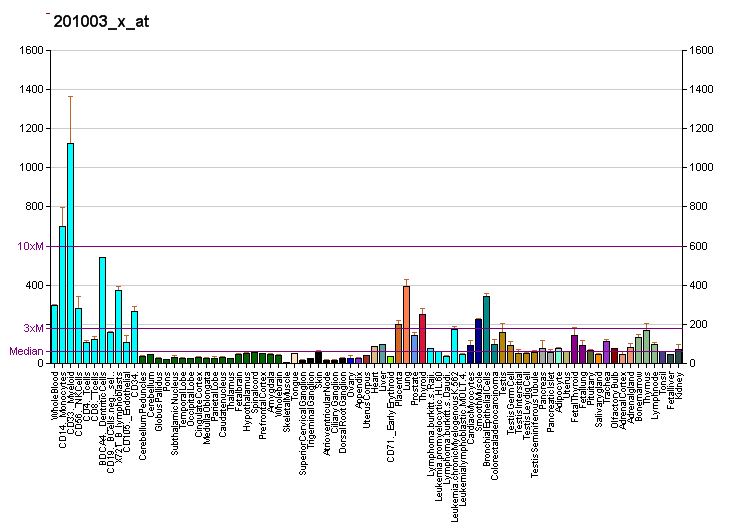

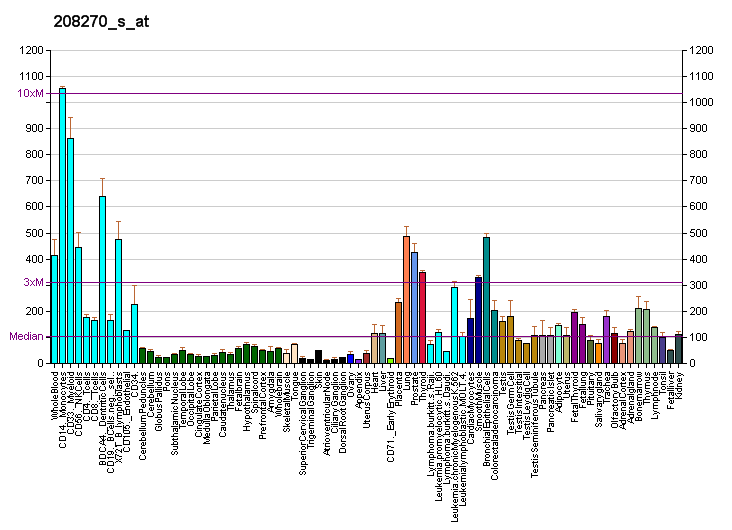
RNA expression pattern
| Bgee | Human / Mouse (ortholog); Top expressed in: mucosa of transverse colon; duodenum; granulocyte; rectum; monocyte; gonad; right uterine tube; mucosa of esophagus; olfactory zone of nasal mucosa; stromal cell of endometrium / Top expressed in: granulocyte; seminal vesicula; crypt of lieberkuhn of small intestine; epithelium of stomach; jejunum; duodenum; pyloric antrum; molar; right kidney; genital tubercle; More reference expression data |
| BioGPS | More reference expression data |
Gene ontology
| Molecular function | peptide binding; zinc ion binding; peptidase activity; aminopeptidase activity; metalloexopeptidase activity; metalloaminopeptidase activity; metallopeptidase activity; hydrolase activity; metal ion binding; epoxide hydrolase activity |
| Cellular component | plasma membrane; extracellular exosome; secretory granule; extracellular space; extracellular region |
| Biological process | proteolysis; negative regulation of blood pressure; peptide catabolic process |
Sources:Amigo / QuickGO
Orthologs
| Databases | NCBI: entry; OMA: entry |
| Species | Human | Mouse |
| Entrez | 6051 | 215615 |
| Ensembl | ENSG00000176393 | ENSMUSG00000041926 |
| UniProt | Q9H4A4 | Q8VCT3 |
| RefSeq (mRNA) | NM_020216; NM_001319182; NM_001319183; NM_001319184 | NM_001159624; NM_145417 |
| RefSeq (protein) | NP_001306111; NP_001306112; NP_001306113; NP_064601 | NP_001153096; NP_663392 |
| Location (UCSC) | Chr 1: 201.98 – 202.01 Mb | Chr 1: 135.19 – 135.21 Mb |
| PubMed search |
- Wikidata
| View/Edit Human | View/Edit Mouse |

Aminopeptidase B is an enzyme that in humans is encoded by the RNPEP gene.
