= SARS1 =

SARS1 may refer to:

- SARS, a respiratory disease caused by virus SARS-CoV-1
- Serine–tRNA ligase, cytoplasmic, an enzyme encoded by the gene SARS1
