= SPANXB1 =

Protein-coding gene in the species Homo sapiens

Identifiers
- Aliases: SPANXB1, B1, CT11.2, SPANX-B, SPANXB, SPANXB2, SPANXF1, SPANXF2, SPANX family member B1
- External IDs: OMIM: 300669; GeneCards: SPANXB1

Gene location (Human)
Chr.	X chromosome (human)
Band	Xq27.1	Start	141,002,594 bp
Band	Xq27.1	End	141,003,706 bp
RNA expression pattern
Bgee	Human / Mouse (ortholog); Top expressed in: left testis; right testis; testicle; sperm; gonad; buccal mucosa cell; tail of epididymis; kidney; liver; human musculoskeletal system / n/a; More reference expression data
BioGPS	n/a
Gene ontology
Molecular function	molecular function
Cellular component	cytoplasm; nucleus
Biological process	spermatid development
Sources:Amigo / QuickGO
Orthologs
Databases	NCBI: entry; OMA: entry
Species	Human	Mouse
Entrez	728695	n/a
Ensembl	ENSG00000227234	n/a
UniProt	Q9NS25	n/a
RefSeq (mRNA)	NM_032461; NM_145664	n/a
RefSeq (protein)	NP_115850	n/a
Location (UCSC)	Chr X: 141 – 141 Mb	n/a
PubMed search		n/a
- Wikidata
View/Edit Human

SPANX family member B1 is a protein that in humans is encoded by the SPANXB1 gene.

== Function ==
Temporally regulated transcription and translation of several testis-specific genes is required to initiate the series of molecular and morphological changes in the male germ cell lineage necessary for the formation of mature spermatozoa. This gene is a member of the SPANX family of cancer/testis-associated genes, which are located in a cluster on chromosome X. The SPANX genes encode deferentially expressed testis-specific proteins that localize to various subcellular compartments. This particular family member contains an additional 18 nucleotides in its coding region compared to the other family members in the same gene cluster. This family member is also subject to gene copy number variation. Although the protein encoded by this gene contains consensus nuclear localization signals, the major site for subcellular localization of expressed protein is in the cytoplasmic droplets of ejaculated spermatozoa. This protein provides a biochemical marker for studying the unique structures in spermatozoa, while attempting to further define its role in spermatogenesis. [provided by RefSeq, Apr 2014].
