= RPAP2 =

Protein-coding gene in humans

Identifiers
- Aliases: RPAP2, C1orf82, Rtr1, RNA polymerase II associated protein 2
- External IDs: OMIM: 611476; MGI: 2141142; GeneCards: RPAP2
Enzyme activity
EC #	BRENDA	ExPASy	KEGG	MetaCyc
3.1.3.16	↗	↗	↗	↗

Gene location (Human)
Chr.	Chromosome 1 (human)
Band	1p22.1	Start	92,299,059 bp
Band	1p22.1	End	92,402,056 bp

Gene location (Mouse)
Chr.	Chromosome 5 (mouse)
Band	5|5 F	Start	107,745,239 bp
Band	5|5 F	End	107,809,704 bp
RNA expression pattern
Bgee	Human / Mouse (ortholog); Top expressed in: Achilles tendon; cerebellar vermis; corpus callosum; Skeletal muscle tissue of biceps brachii; gonad; epithelium of colon; ventricular zone; pons; tonsil; testicle / Top expressed in: zygote; primary oocyte; secondary oocyte; spermatocyte; genital tubercle; seminiferous tubule; tail of embryo; spermatid; facial motor nucleus; muscle of thigh; More reference expression data
BioGPS	n/a
Gene ontology
Molecular function	phosphoprotein phosphatase activity; metal ion binding; hydrolase activity; RNA polymerase II CTD heptapeptide repeat phosphatase activity; protein serine/threonine phosphatase activity; protein binding; RNA polymerase core enzyme binding
Cellular component	nucleolus; RNA polymerase II, holoenzyme; cytoplasm; nucleus; nucleoplasm; cytosol
Biological process	snRNA transcription; transcription, DNA-templated; dephosphorylation of RNA polymerase II C-terminal domain; regulation of transcription, DNA-templated; snRNA transcription by RNA polymerase II
Sources:Amigo / QuickGO
Orthologs
Databases	NCBI: entry; OMA: entry
Species	Human	Mouse
Entrez	79871	231571
Ensembl	ENSG00000122484	ENSMUSG00000033773
UniProt	Q8IXW5	Q8VC34
RefSeq (mRNA)	NM_024813	NM_001163461; NM_001163462; NM_001289569; NM_001289570; NM_144911 NM_001359916; NM_001359917; NM_001359918
RefSeq (protein)	NP_079089	NP_001156933; NP_001156934; NP_001276498; NP_001276499; NP_659160 NP_001346845; NP_001346846; NP_001346847
Location (UCSC)	Chr 1: 92.3 – 92.4 Mb	Chr 5: 107.75 – 107.81 Mb
PubMed search
- Wikidata
View/Edit Human	View/Edit Mouse

RNA polymerase II associated protein 2, also known as RPAP2, is a human gene.
