= RSAD1 =

Protein-coding gene in the species Homo sapiens

Identifiers
- Aliases: RSAD1, radical S-adenosyl methionine domain containing 1, HemW
- External IDs: MGI: 3039628; HomoloGene: 41252; GeneCards: RSAD1; OMA:RSAD1 - orthologs

Gene location (Human)
Chr.	Chromosome 17 (human)
Band	17q21.33	Start	50,478,860 bp
Band	17q21.33	End	50,485,974 bp

Gene location (Mouse)
Chr.	Chromosome 11 (mouse)
Band	11|11 D	Start	94,430,624 bp
Band	11|11 D	End	94,440,081 bp
RNA expression pattern
Bgee	Human / Mouse (ortholog); Top expressed in: right hemisphere of cerebellum; body of pancreas; canal of the cervix; apex of heart; right adrenal gland; gastrocnemius muscle; left adrenal gland; right adrenal cortex; right lobe of thyroid gland; left adrenal cortex / Top expressed in: interventricular septum; otolith organ; utricle; hand; foot; medial dorsal nucleus; myocardium of ventricle; conjunctival fornix; ankle; substantia nigra; More reference expression data
BioGPS	n/a
Gene ontology
Molecular function	4 iron, 4 sulfur cluster binding; oxidoreductase activity; coproporphyrinogen oxidase activity; iron-sulfur cluster binding; catalytic activity; metal ion binding
Cellular component	cytoplasm; mitochondrion
Biological process	porphyrin-containing compound biosynthetic process
Sources:Amigo / QuickGO
Orthologs
Species	Human	Mouse
Entrez	55316	237926
Ensembl	ENSG00000136444	ENSMUSG00000039096
UniProt	Q9HA92	Q5SUV1
RefSeq (mRNA)	NM_018346	NM_001013381
RefSeq (protein)	NP_060816	NP_001013399
Location (UCSC)	Chr 17: 50.48 – 50.49 Mb	Chr 11: 94.43 – 94.44 Mb
PubMed search
- Wikidata
View/Edit Human	View/Edit Mouse

Radical S-adenosyl methionine domain containing 1 is a protein that in humans is encoded by the RSAD1 gene.
