= SIDT1 =

Protein-coding gene in the species Homo sapiens

Identifiers
- Aliases: SIDT1, B830021E24Rik, SID-1, SID1, SID1 transmembrane family member 1
- External IDs: OMIM: 606816; MGI: 2443155; GeneCards: SIDT1

Gene location (Human)
Chr.	Chromosome 3 (human)
Band	3q13.2	Start	113,532,555 bp
Band	3q13.2	End	113,629,575 bp

Gene location (Mouse)
Chr.	Chromosome 16 (mouse)
Band	16|16 B4	Start	44,060,543 bp
Band	16|16 B4	End	44,153,559 bp
RNA expression pattern
Bgee	Human / Mouse (ortholog); Top expressed in: right hemisphere of cerebellum; rectum; mucosa of sigmoid colon; granulocyte; right frontal lobe; tonsil; lymph node; spleen; gallbladder; dorsolateral prefrontal cortex / Top expressed in: primary visual cortex; superior frontal gyrus; lacrimal gland; dentate gyrus of hippocampal formation granule cell; primary motor cortex; parotid gland; zygote; cerebellar cortex; submandibular gland; hippocampus proper; More reference expression data
BioGPS	n/a
Gene ontology
Molecular function	RNA transmembrane transporter activity; RNA binding; double-stranded RNA binding
Cellular component	membrane; integral component of membrane; lysosome; plasma membrane
Biological process	dsRNA transport; RNA transport
Sources:Amigo / QuickGO
Orthologs
Databases	NCBI: entry; OMA: entry
Species	Human	Mouse
Entrez	54847	320007
Ensembl	ENSG00000072858	ENSMUSG00000022696
UniProt	Q9NXL6	Q6AXF6
RefSeq (mRNA)	NM_001308350; NM_017699; NM_001322294; NM_001322295; NM_001322296 NM_001322297; NM_001322298; NM_001322299; NM_001322300	NM_001159419; NM_198034
RefSeq (protein)	NP_001295279; NP_001309223; NP_001309224; NP_001309225; NP_001309226 NP_001309227; NP_001309228; NP_001309229; NP_060169	NP_001152891; NP_932151
Location (UCSC)	Chr 3: 113.53 – 113.63 Mb	Chr 16: 44.06 – 44.15 Mb
PubMed search
- Wikidata
View/Edit Human	View/Edit Mouse

SID1 transmembrane family member 1 is a protein that in humans is encoded by the SIDT1 gene.

== Function ==
The protein encoded by this gene belongs to SID1 family of transmembrane dsRNA-gated channels. Family members transport dsRNA into cells and are required for systemic RNA interference.

A 2012 study showed that SIDT1 facilitates contact-dependent bidirectional transfer of small RNAs between human cells and that SIDT1-mediated microRNA-21 transfer may contribute to gemcitabine resistance in human adenocarcinoma cells.
