= SEPTIN11 =

Protein-coding gene in the species Homo sapiens

Identifiers
- Aliases: SEPTIN11, septin 11, SEPT11
- External IDs: OMIM: 612887; MGI: 1277214; GeneCards: SEPTIN11

Gene location (Human)
Chr.	Chromosome 4 (human)
Band	4q21.1	Start	76,949,751 bp
Band	4q21.1	End	77,040,384 bp

Gene location (Mouse)
Chr.	Chromosome 5 (mouse)
Band	5 E2|5 47.29 cM	Start	93,241,296 bp
Band	5 E2|5 47.29 cM	End	93,324,306 bp
RNA expression pattern
Bgee	Human / Mouse (ortholog); Top expressed in: ventricular zone; ganglionic eminence; Achilles tendon; stromal cell of endometrium; sural nerve; epithelium of colon; periodontal fiber; decidua; Brodmann area 9; right frontal lobe / Top expressed in: Gonadal ridge; maxillary prominence; mandibular prominence; dermis; tail of embryo; abdominal wall; ventricular zone; genital tubercle; renal corpuscle; atrioventricular valve; More reference expression data
BioGPS	n/a
Gene ontology
Molecular function	nucleotide binding; GTP binding; protein binding; GTPase activity; molecular adaptor activity
Cellular component	cytoplasm; axon; cell junction; dendritic spine; cell projection; synapse; cytoskeleton; stress fiber; postsynapse; glutamatergic synapse; GABA-ergic synapse; postsynaptic specialization of symmetric synapse; septin ring; microtubule cytoskeleton; septin complex; septin filament array
Biological process	cell cycle; protein heterooligomerization; cell division; regulation of synapse organization; mitotic cytokinesis; septin ring assembly; cilium assembly; cytoskeleton-dependent cytokinesis
Sources:Amigo / QuickGO
Orthologs
Databases	NCBI: entry; OMA: entry
Species	Human	Mouse
Entrez	55752	52398
Ensembl	ENSG00000138758	ENSMUSG00000058013
UniProt	Q9NVA2	Q8C1B7
RefSeq (mRNA)	NM_001306147; NM_018243	NM_001009818; NM_001310669; NM_001310671; NM_001347377
RefSeq (protein)	NP_001293076; NP_060713	NP_001009818; NP_001297598; NP_001297600; NP_001334306
Location (UCSC)	Chr 4: 76.95 – 77.04 Mb	Chr 5: 93.24 – 93.32 Mb
PubMed search
- Wikidata
View/Edit Human	View/Edit Mouse

Septin-11 is a protein that in humans is encoded by the SEPTIN11 gene (previously SEPT11).
