= SAPCD1 =

Protein-coding gene in the species Homo sapiens

Identifiers
- Aliases: SAPCD1, C6orf26, NG23, suppressor APC domain containing 1
- External IDs: MGI: 2388100; HomoloGene: 86703; GeneCards: SAPCD1; OMA:SAPCD1 - orthologs

Gene location (Human)
Chr.	Chromosome 6 (human)
Band	6p21.33	Start	31,762,996 bp
Band	6p21.33	End	31,764,851 bp

Gene location (Mouse)
Chr.	Chromosome 17 (mouse)
Band	17|17 B1	Start	35,244,935 bp
Band	17|17 B1	End	35,246,992 bp
RNA expression pattern
Bgee	Human / Mouse (ortholog); Top expressed in: skin of leg; right uterine tube; gonad; skin of abdomen; testicle; mucosa of transverse colon; spleen; granulocyte; pituitary gland; right testis / Top expressed in: epithelium of lens; embryo; efferent ductule; embryo; morula; blastocyst; vas deferens; ventricular zone; spleen; ganglionic eminence; More reference expression data
BioGPS	n/a
Orthologs
Species	Human	Mouse
Entrez	401251	78376
Ensembl	ENSG00000237918; ENSG00000227074; ENSG00000234951; ENSG00000227861; ENSG00000228727 ENSG00000229176	ENSMUSG00000036185
UniProt	Q5SSQ6	Q9CY86
RefSeq (mRNA)	NM_001039651	NM_023893
RefSeq (protein)	NP_001034740	NP_076382
Location (UCSC)	Chr 6: 31.76 – 31.76 Mb	Chr 17: 35.24 – 35.25 Mb
PubMed search
- Wikidata
View/Edit Human	View/Edit Mouse

Suppressor APC domain containing 1 is a protein that in humans is encoded by the SAPCD1 gene.
