= SEPTIN7 =

Protein-coding gene in the species Homo sapiens

An Error has occurred retrieving Wikidata item for infobox Septin-7 is a protein that in humans is encoded by the SEPTIN7 gene (previously SEPT7).

== Function ==
This gene encodes a protein that is highly similar to the CDC10 protein of Saccharomyces cerevisiae. The protein also shares similarity with Diff 6 of Drosophila and with H5 of mouse. Each of these similar proteins, including the yeast CDC10, contains a GTP-binding motif. The yeast CDC10 protein is a structural component of the 10 nm filament which lies inside the cytoplasmic membrane and is essential for cytokinesis. Although the exact function of this gene has not yet been determined, its high similarity to yeast CDC10 and the high conservative nature of eukaryotic cell cycle machinery suggest a similar role to that of its yeast counterpart. Alternative splicing results in two transcript variants encoding different isoforms.

== Interactions ==
SEPT7 has been shown to interact with SEPT2 and SEPT9.
