= RPS27L =

Protein found in humans

Identifiers
- Aliases: RPS27L, ribosomal protein S27 like
- External IDs: OMIM: 612055; MGI: 1915191; GeneCards: RPS27L
Available structures
PDB	Ortholog search: PDBe RCSB
PDB	List of PDB id codes 4UG0, 4V6X, 5A2Q, 5AJ0

Gene location (Human)
Chr.	Chromosome 15 (human)
Band	15q22.2	Start	63,125,872 bp
Band	15q22.2	End	63,158,021 bp

Gene location (Mouse)
Chr.	Chromosome 9 (mouse)
Band	9|9 C	Start	66,853,368 bp
Band	9|9 C	End	66,856,798 bp
RNA expression pattern
Bgee	Human / Mouse (ortholog); Top expressed in: seminal vesicula; Epithelium of choroid plexus; jejunal mucosa; palpebral conjunctiva; parotid gland; kidney tubule; mucosa of sigmoid colon; right adrenal cortex; body of pancreas; tail of epididymis / Top expressed in: embryo; endocardial cushion; embryo; parotid gland; right kidney; seminal vesicula; lacrimal gland; epiblast; yolk sac; zygote; More reference expression data
BioGPS	n/a
Gene ontology
Molecular function	structural constituent of ribosome; translation activator activity; cysteine-type endopeptidase activator activity involved in apoptotic process; protein binding; metal ion binding; RNA binding
Cellular component	cytosolic small ribosomal subunit; ribosome; intracellular anatomical structure; nucleus
Biological process	ribosomal small subunit assembly; intrinsic apoptotic signaling pathway in response to DNA damage by p53 class mediator; mitotic G1 DNA damage checkpoint signaling; DNA repair; protein biosynthesis; activation of cysteine-type endopeptidase activity involved in apoptotic process; DNA damage response, signal transduction by p53 class mediator resulting in transcription of p21 class mediator; positive regulation of translation
Sources:Amigo / QuickGO
Orthologs
Databases	NCBI: entry; OMA: entry
Species	Human	Mouse
Entrez	51065	67941
Ensembl	ENSG00000185088	ENSMUSG00000036781
UniProt	Q71UM5	Q6ZWY3
RefSeq (mRNA)	NM_015920	NM_026467; NM_001311101; NM_001361106
RefSeq (protein)	NP_057004	NP_001298030; NP_080743; NP_001348035
Location (UCSC)	Chr 15: 63.13 – 63.16 Mb	Chr 9: 66.85 – 66.86 Mb
PubMed search
- Wikidata
View/Edit Human	View/Edit Mouse

Ribosomal protein S27 like is a protein that in humans is encoded by the RPS27L gene.

== Function ==
This gene encodes a protein sharing 96% amino acid similarity with ribosomal protein S27, which suggests the encoded protein may be a component of the 40S ribosomal subunit. [provided by RefSeq, Jul 2008].
