= MENT =

Ment or MENT may refer to:

== People ==
- Eva Ment (1606–1652), Dutch governor's wife

== Other uses ==
- Master of Enterprise
- MENT BC, a Greek basketball club
- Myeloid and erythroid nuclear termination stage specific protein, a member of the serpin family of protease inhibitors
- Trestolone (7α-methyl-19-nortestosterone) a synthetic androgen developed for male contraception
