= BMS-986263 =

BMS-986263 is an experimental "retinoid-conjugated lipid nanoparticle (LNP) containing HSP47 small interfering RNA (siRNA)" intended to block the synthesis of HSP47, "a collagen-specific chaperone protein involved in fibrosis development". The drug is being tested on people with serious hepatic impairment or fibrosis, including compensated cirrhosis resulting from nonalcoholic fatty liver disease.
