= SERPINB1 =

Protein-coding gene in the species Homo sapiens

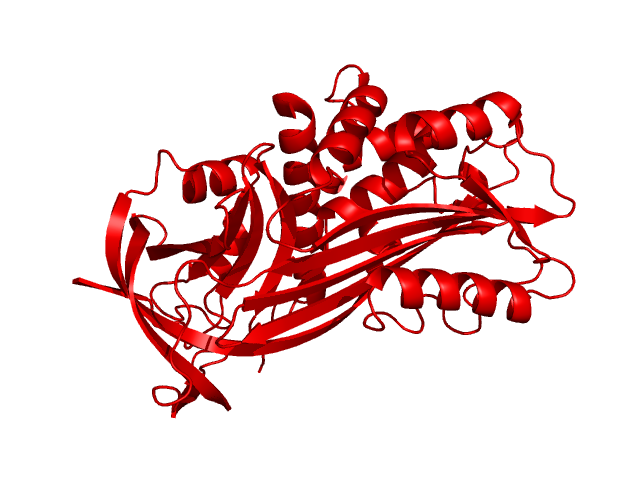

Identifiers
- Aliases: SERPINB1, EI, ELANH2, HEL57, LEI, M/NEI, MNEI, PI-2, PI2, HEL-S-27, serpin family B member 1
- External IDs: OMIM: 130135; MGI: 1913472; GeneCards: SERPINB1
Available structures
PDB	Ortholog search: PDBe RCSB
PDB	List of PDB id codes 4GA7

Gene location (Human)
Chr.	Chromosome 6 (human)
Band	6p25.2	Start	2,832,332 bp
Band	6p25.2	End	2,841,959 bp

Gene location (Mouse)
Chr.	Chromosome 13 (mouse)
Band	13 A3.2|13 13.75 cM	Start	33,026,075 bp
Band	13 A3.2|13 13.75 cM	End	33,035,168 bp
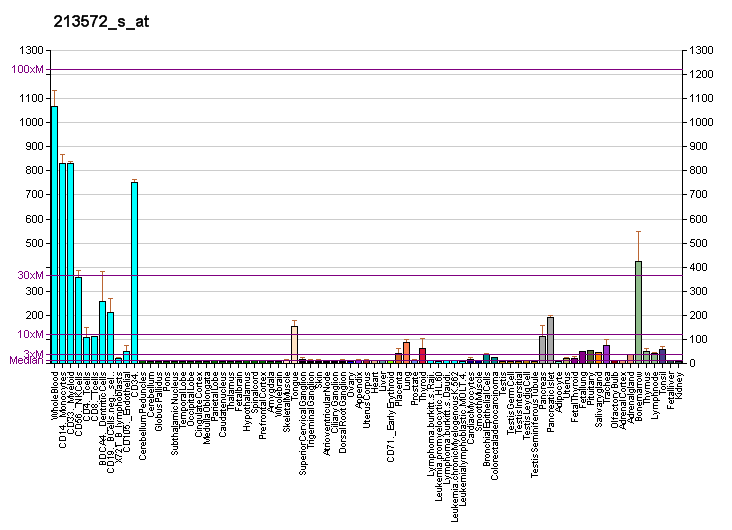

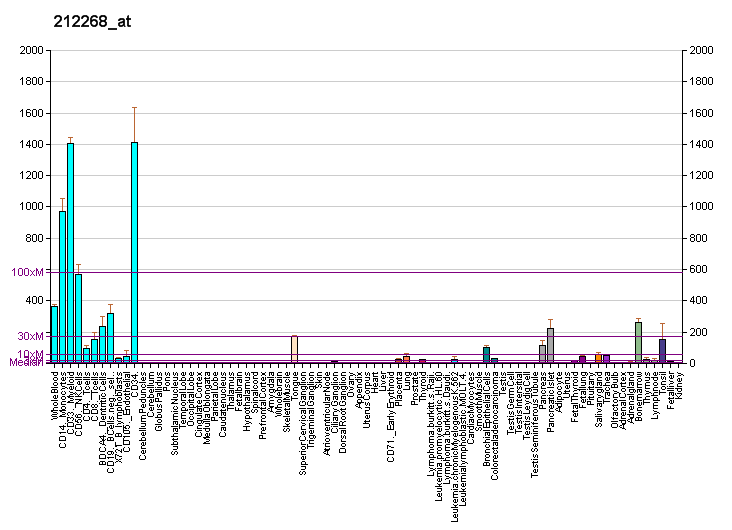
RNA expression pattern
Bgee	Human / Mouse (ortholog); Top expressed in: mucosa of pharynx; oral cavity; bone marrow; monocyte; palpebral conjunctiva; body of pancreas; jejunal mucosa; trabecular bone; bone marrow cell; duodenum / Top expressed in: granulocyte; left colon; jejunum; duodenum; mucous cell of stomach; esophagus; tibiofemoral joint; epithelium of stomach; ileum; Paneth cell; More reference expression data
BioGPS	More reference expression data
Gene ontology
Molecular function	peptidase inhibitor activity; serine-type endopeptidase inhibitor activity; protein binding
Cellular component	cytoplasm; extracellular exosome; membrane; extracellular space; secretory granule lumen; extracellular matrix; extracellular region; collagen-containing extracellular matrix
Biological process	negative regulation of peptidase activity; negative regulation of endopeptidase activity; neutrophil degranulation; type B pancreatic cell proliferation
Sources:Amigo / QuickGO
Orthologs
Databases	NCBI: entry; OMA: entry
Species	Human	Mouse
Entrez	1992	66222
Ensembl	ENSG00000021355	ENSMUSG00000044734
UniProt	P30740	Q9D154
RefSeq (mRNA)	NM_030666	NM_025429
RefSeq (protein)	NP_109591	NP_079705
Location (UCSC)	Chr 6: 2.83 – 2.84 Mb	Chr 13: 33.03 – 33.04 Mb
PubMed search
- Wikidata
View/Edit Human	View/Edit Mouse

Leukocyte elastase inhibitor (LEI) also known as serpin B1 is a protein that in humans is encoded by the SERPINB1 gene. It is a member of the clade B serpins or ov-serpins (ovalbumin related serpins) founded by ovalbumin.

MNEI (monocyte/neutrophil elastase inhibitor) is the mouse orthologue of human SerpinB1.

== Function ==
SerpinB1 is a cytoplasmic serine protease inhibitor of polymorphonuclear neutrophils. Among other serine proteases, it specifically inhibits neutrophil elastase, PR3 and cathepsin G, all found in neutrophil granules, by a suicide inhibition mechanism. SerpinB1 was found to reduce tissue damage caused by the mentioned proteases during inflammation and has a role in neutrophil homeostasis in mice. In various infection models (e.g. pneumonia) correlation of SerpinB1 absence and lack of microbial clearance have been shown. Different knockout strains serve as model to investigate the role of SerpinB1 in vivo.

== See also ==
- Serpin
