= SERPINB3 =

Protein-coding gene in the species Homo sapiens

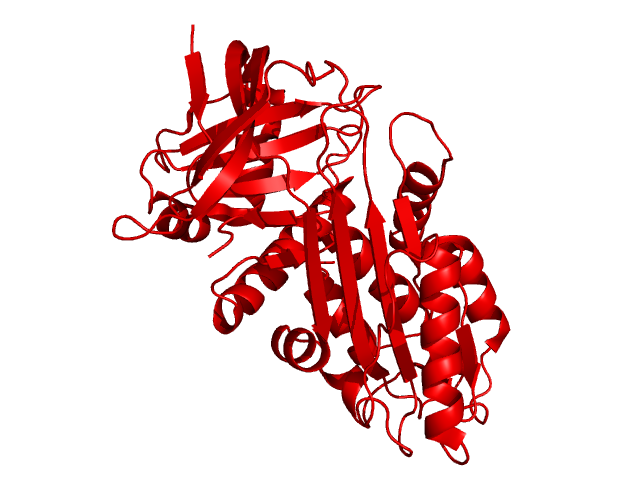

Identifiers
- Aliases: SERPINB3, HsT1196, SCC, SCCA-1, SCCA-PD, SCCA1, T4-A, SSCA1, serpin family B member 3
- External IDs: OMIM: 600517; MGI: 2683295; GeneCards: SERPINB3
Available structures
PDB	Ortholog search: PDBe RCSB
PDB	List of PDB id codes 2ZV6, 4ZK0, 4ZK3

Gene location (Human)
Chr.	Chromosome 18 (human)
Band	18q21.33	Start	63,655,197 bp
Band	18q21.33	End	63,661,893 bp

Gene location (Mouse)
Chr.	Chromosome 1 (mouse)
Band	1 E2.1|1	Start	107,005,897 bp
Band	1 E2.1|1	End	107,011,236 bp
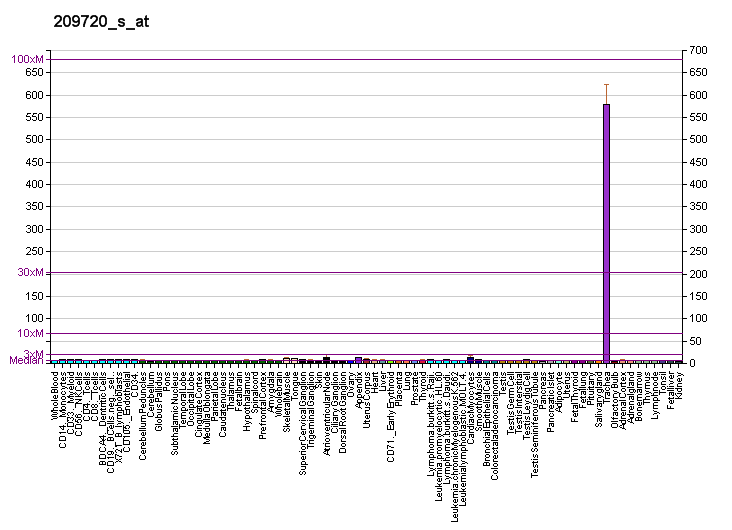

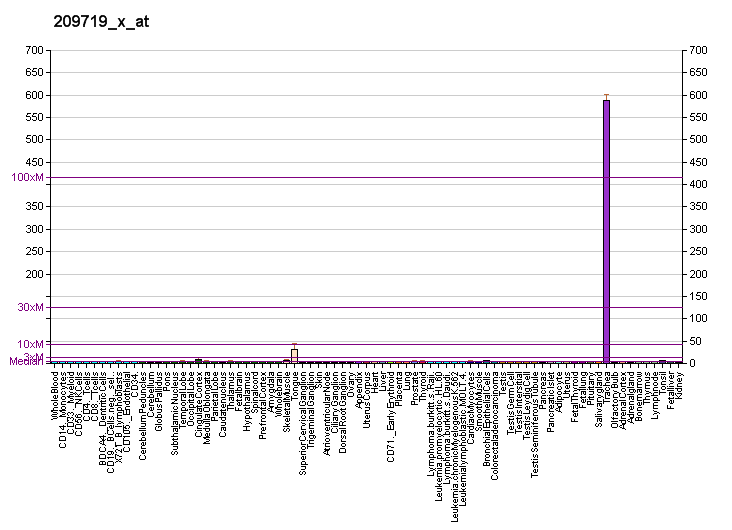

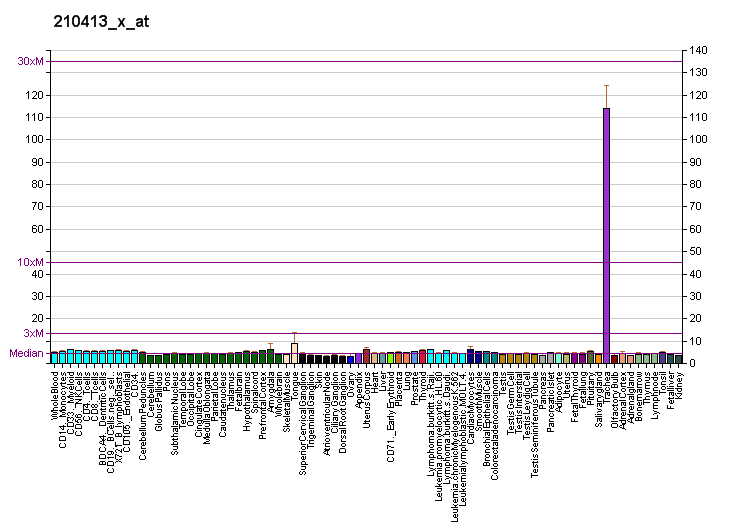
RNA expression pattern
Bgee	Human / Mouse (ortholog); Top expressed in: olfactory zone of nasal mucosa; nasal epithelium; vulva; human penis; mucosa of paranasal sinus; epithelium of bronchus; bronchial epithelial cell; gums; gingival epithelium; mucosa of pharynx / Top expressed in: thymus; esophagus; More reference expression data
BioGPS	More reference expression data
Gene ontology
Molecular function	virus receptor activity; protease binding; cysteine-type endopeptidase inhibitor activity; peptidase inhibitor activity; serine-type endopeptidase inhibitor activity
Cellular component	nucleus; vesicle; cytoplasmic vesicle; extracellular exosome; cytoplasm; extracellular region; extracellular space; azurophil granule lumen
Biological process	paracrine signaling; positive regulation of cell population proliferation; autocrine signaling; negative regulation of catalytic activity; negative regulation of JUN kinase activity; positive regulation of endopeptidase activity; positive regulation of epithelial to mesenchymal transition; negative regulation of proteolysis; negative regulation of endopeptidase activity; positive regulation of cell migration; viral entry into host cell; negative regulation of peptidase activity; neutrophil degranulation
Sources:Amigo / QuickGO
Orthologs
Databases	NCBI: entry; OMA: entry
Species	Human	Mouse
Entrez	6317	394252
Ensembl	ENSG00000057149	ENSMUSG00000058017
UniProt	P29508	Q6UKZ0
RefSeq (mRNA)	NM_006919	NM_201376
RefSeq (protein)	NP_008850	NP_958764
Location (UCSC)	Chr 18: 63.66 – 63.66 Mb	Chr 1: 107.01 – 107.01 Mb
PubMed search
- Wikidata
View/Edit Human	View/Edit Mouse

Serpin B3 is a protein that in humans is encoded by the SERPINB3 gene.

== See also ==
- Serpin
