= SERPINB10 =

Protein-coding gene in the species Homo sapiens

Identifiers
- Aliases: SERPINB10, PI-10, PI10, serpin family B member 10
- External IDs: OMIM: 602058; MGI: 2138648; GeneCards: SERPINB10

Gene location (Human)
Chr.	Chromosome 18 (human)
Band	18q22.1	Start	63,897,174 bp
Band	18q22.1	End	63,936,111 bp

Gene location (Mouse)
Chr.	Chromosome 1 (mouse)
Band	1|1 E2.1	Start	107,456,757 bp
Band	1|1 E2.1	End	107,477,001 bp
RNA expression pattern
Bgee	Human / Mouse (ortholog); Top expressed in: bone marrow; bone marrow cell; testicle; monocyte; trabecular bone; epithelium of bronchus; olfactory zone of nasal mucosa; stromal cell of endometrium; blood; bronchial epithelial cell / Top expressed in: lobe of liver; granulocyte; epidermis; esophagus; zone of skin; lip; bone marrow; spleen; white adipose tissue; thymus; More reference expression data
BioGPS	n/a
Gene ontology
Molecular function	peptidase inhibitor activity; serine-type endopeptidase inhibitor activity
Cellular component	cytoplasm; extracellular space; plasma membrane; secretory granule membrane; ficolin-1-rich granule membrane; nucleus
Biological process	negative regulation of peptidase activity; negative regulation of endopeptidase activity; neutrophil degranulation; negative regulation of apoptotic process
Sources:Amigo / QuickGO
Orthologs
Databases	NCBI: entry; OMA: entry
Species	Human	Mouse
Entrez	5273	241197
Ensembl	ENSG00000242550	ENSMUSG00000092572
UniProt	P48595	Q8K1K6
RefSeq (mRNA)	NM_005024	NM_001160307; NM_198028
RefSeq (protein)	NP_005015	NP_001153779; NP_932145
Location (UCSC)	Chr 18: 63.9 – 63.94 Mb	Chr 1: 107.46 – 107.48 Mb
PubMed search
- Wikidata
View/Edit Human	View/Edit Mouse

Serpin peptidase inhibitor, clade B (ovalbumin), member 10 is a protein that in humans is encoded by the SERPINB10 gene.

== Function ==
The superfamily of high molecular weight serine proteinase inhibitors (serpins) regulate a diverse set of intracellular and extracellular processes such as complement activation, fibrinolysis, coagulation, cellular differentiation, tumor suppression, apoptosis, and cell migration. Serpins are characterized by a well-conserved tertiary structure that consists of 3 beta sheets and 8 or 9 alpha helices. A critical portion of the molecule, the reactive center loop connects beta sheets A and C. Protease inhibitor-10 (PI10; SERPINB10) is a member of the ov-serpin subfamily, which, relative to the archetypal serpin PI1, is characterized by a high degree of homology to chicken ovalbumin, lack of N- and C-terminal extensions, absence of a signal peptide, and a serine rather than an asparagine residue at the penultimate position.
