= SERPINA2 =

Protein-coding gene in the species Homo sapiens

Identifiers
- Aliases: SERPINA2, ARGS, ATR, PIL, SERPINA2P, psiATR, serpin family A member 2 (gene/pseudogene)
- External IDs: GeneCards: SERPINA2

Gene location (Human)
Chr.	Chromosome 14 (human)
Band	14q32.13	Start	94,364,313 bp
Band	14q32.13	End	94,366,698 bp
RNA expression pattern
Bgee	Human / Mouse (ortholog); Top expressed in: testicle; granulocyte; liver; blood; right lobe of liver; monocyte; appendix; islet of Langerhans; olfactory zone of nasal mucosa; left uterine tube / n/a; More reference expression data
BioGPS	n/a
Gene ontology
Molecular function	peptidase inhibitor activity; protein binding; serine-type endopeptidase inhibitor activity
Cellular component	endoplasmic reticulum; extracellular space
Biological process	negative regulation of peptidase activity; negative regulation of endopeptidase activity
Sources:Amigo / QuickGO
Orthologs
Databases	NCBI: entry; OMA: entry
Species	Human	Mouse
Entrez	390502	n/a
Ensembl	ENSG00000274821; ENSG00000258597	n/a
UniProt	P20848	n/a
RefSeq (mRNA)	NM_006220	n/a
RefSeq (protein)	n/a	n/a
Location (UCSC)	Chr 14: 94.36 – 94.37 Mb	n/a
PubMed search		n/a
- Wikidata
View/Edit Human

Serpin peptidase inhibitor, clade A (alpha-1 antiproteinase, antitrypsin), member 2 is a protein that in humans is encoded by the SERPINA2 gene. Serine peptidase inhibitor, clade A member 2 belongs to the member of serine family of proteins which have a functional activity of inhibiting serine proteases.

== Discovery ==
SERPINA2 was known as pseudogenes as it had a very similar structure and function to SERPINA1. During the cloning characterisation of alpha 1- antitrypsin like gene, it was discovered that SERPINA2 did not have any promoter but did contain substantial homology to SERPINA1 gene sequence.

== Gene location ==
SERPINA2 is located at 14q32.13.

== Gene expression and localisation ==
Extracellular predictions of SERPINs and common domain clades show that ER localisation of SERPINA2 are most likely be more, these common ER motifs indicates their localisation are most likely to be in the ER.

== Structure ==
Population studies indicate that this gene is polymorphic. Deletions, frameshift mutations, and a critical start codon mutation (ATG to ATA) have been found in some populations, as well as an allele that can encode a functional protein. This gene may be an evolving pseudogene. The reference genome contains the start codon mutation and has a coding region deletion. A three-dimensional model of SERPINA2 was created using the non-deleted form of crystal structure, which is homologous with the SERPINA1 protein. The model was created using swissmodel in EXPASY, and has shown that SERPINA2 preserves a SERPIN reactive centre loop which is most compatible with protease inhibitory activity. The consensus sequence surrounding the reactive centre loop have diverged considerably so that now it contains tryptophan serine motifs instead of the methionine serine motif.

== Function ==
SERPINA2 was previously identified as pseudogene; however, recently there have been new evidence which specifies that SERPINA2 produces an active transcript that is responsible for encoding protein located in the endoplasmic reticulum. A detailed study of the SERPINA2 gene across multiple ethnic groups have relieved that with the addition of SERPINA2 gene therein a haplotype characterisation by partial deletion which has patterns suggesting positive selection of loss of function of SERPINA2 protein.

SERPINA2 studies have shown different results regarding the extent of sequence degeneration it can undergo. Bao et al. (1988) describes in his studies that sequence with RNA splice sites are preserved in SERPINA2, and when expressed, it encodes a new secretory protein (SERPIN) with different substrate specificity. These studies with SERPINA2 in humans have concluded that recent positive selection is favoured by the loss of SERPINA2 function and pseudogenization. SERPINA2 genes are mostly expressed in leukocytes and testes which gives a residual expression in liver. SERPINA2 have been linked with ongoing adaptive process linked with advantages in the role of fertility and host pathogen interactions.

== Mutations ==
A critical mutation present in the start codon and an 2kb deletion over exon IV and part of exon V. This deletion in the start codon occurs at a frequency of 30%. Studies with SERPINA2 in vitro and in vivo have shown that it expresses stable proteins with n-linked glycosylation with a molecular weight of 52kDa and compatible with regular SERPINs

== Disease associated ==
SERPINA2 is a member of SERPIN family, which are known as protein coding genes. A disease associated with this gene is emphysema, due to aat protein deficiency. SERPINA2 has similar function to SERPINA1 and is related to the function of serine type peptidase inhibitor activity.
