= SERPINA9 =

Protein-coding gene in the species Homo sapiens

Identifiers
- Aliases: SERPINA9, GCET1, SERPINA11, SERPINA11b, serpin family A member 9
- External IDs: OMIM: 615677; MGI: 1919157; GeneCards: SERPINA9

Gene location (Human)
Chr.	Chromosome 14 (human)
Band	14q32.13	Start	94,462,717 bp
Band	14q32.13	End	94,479,689 bp

Gene location (Mouse)
Chr.	Chromosome 12 (mouse)
Band	12|12 E	Start	103,961,002 bp
Band	12|12 E	End	103,980,014 bp
RNA expression pattern
Bgee	Human / Mouse (ortholog); Top expressed in: epithelium of nasopharynx; testicle; lymph node; appendix; superior surface of tongue; oral cavity; tonsil; skin of abdomen; skin of leg; gonad / Top expressed in: striatum of neuraxis; esophagus; lip; superior frontal gyrus; exocrine gland; liver; visual cortex; cerebellum; cerebellar cortex; primary visual cortex; More reference expression data
BioGPS	n/a
Gene ontology
Molecular function	peptidase inhibitor activity; serine-type endopeptidase inhibitor activity
Cellular component	extracellular region; membrane; cytoplasm; extracellular space
Biological process	negative regulation of peptidase activity; negative regulation of endopeptidase activity
Sources:Amigo / QuickGO
Orthologs
Databases	NCBI: entry; OMA: entry
Species	Human	Mouse
Entrez	327657	71907
Ensembl	ENSG00000170054	ENSMUSG00000058260
UniProt	Q86WD7	Q9D7D2
RefSeq (mRNA)	NM_001042518; NM_001284275; NM_001284276; NM_175739	NM_027997; NM_001361910; NM_001361912
RefSeq (protein)	NP_001035983; NP_001271204; NP_001271205; NP_783866	NP_082273; NP_001348839; NP_001348841
Location (UCSC)	Chr 14: 94.46 – 94.48 Mb	Chr 12: 103.96 – 103.98 Mb
PubMed search
- Wikidata
View/Edit Human	View/Edit Mouse

Serpin A9 also known as centerin or GCET1 is a protein that in humans is encoded by the SERPINA9 gene located on chromosome 14q32.1. Serpin A9 is a member of the serpin family of serine protease inhibitors.

== Function ==
The expression of SERPINA9 is restricted to germinal center B cells and lymphoid malignancies. SERPINA9 is likely to function in vivo in the germinal center as an efficient inhibitor of trypsin-like proteases.
