= SERPINB8 =

Protein-coding gene in the species Homo sapiens

Identifiers
- Aliases: SERPINB8, CAP2, PI8, serpin family B member 8, PSS5, PI-8, HMSD, HSMD-v, C18orf53
- External IDs: OMIM: 601697; MGI: 894657; GeneCards: SERPINB8

Gene location (Human)
Chr.	Chromosome 18 (human)
Band	18q22.1	Start	63,970,029 bp
Band	18q22.1	End	64,019,779 bp

Gene location (Mouse)
Chr.	Chromosome 1 (mouse)
Band	1|1 E2.1	Start	107,517,736 bp
Band	1|1 E2.1	End	107,538,214 bp
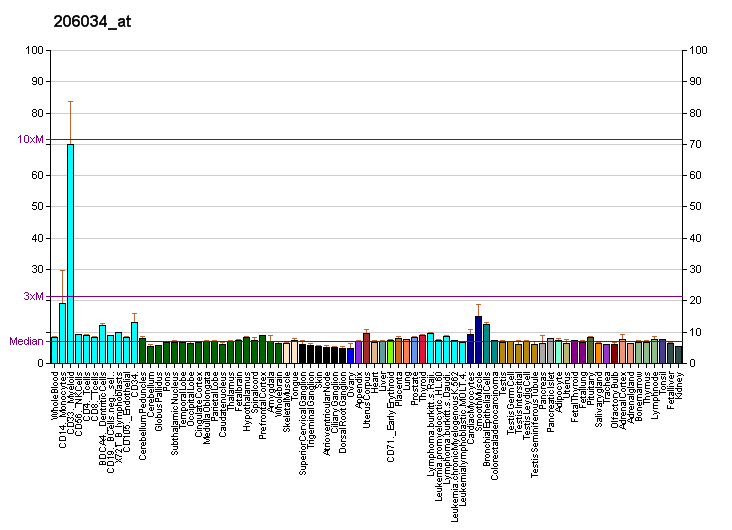
RNA expression pattern
Bgee	Human / Mouse (ortholog); Top expressed in: monocyte; skin of leg; skin of abdomen; granulocyte; gallbladder; islet of Langerhans; gingival epithelium; Descending thoracic aorta; tibial arteries; testicle / Top expressed in: lumbar spinal ganglion; esophagus; skin of external ear; lip; skin of back; conjunctival fornix; skin of abdomen; stroma of bone marrow; epidermis; cervix; More reference expression data
BioGPS	More reference expression data
Gene ontology
Molecular function	peptidase inhibitor activity; protein binding; serine-type endopeptidase inhibitor activity
Cellular component	cytoplasm; cytosol; extracellular exosome; extracellular space; collagen-containing extracellular matrix
Biological process	negative regulation of peptidase activity; negative regulation of endopeptidase activity; epithelial cell-cell adhesion
Sources:Amigo / QuickGO
Orthologs
Databases	NCBI: entry; OMA: entry
Species	Human	Mouse
Entrez	5271	20725
Ensembl	ENSG00000166401	ENSMUSG00000026315
UniProt	P50452	O08800
RefSeq (mRNA)	NM_001031848; NM_001276490; NM_002640; NM_198833; NM_001348367 NM_001348368; NM_001348369; NM_001348370; NM_001366198	NM_001159748; NM_011459
RefSeq (protein)	NP_001027018; NP_001263419; NP_002631; NP_942130; NP_001335296 NP_001335297; NP_001335298; NP_001335299; NP_001353127	NP_001153220; NP_035589
Location (UCSC)	Chr 18: 63.97 – 64.02 Mb	Chr 1: 107.52 – 107.54 Mb
PubMed search
- Wikidata
View/Edit Human	View/Edit Mouse

Serpin B8 is a protein that in humans is encoded by the SERPINB8 gene.

== See also ==
- Serpin
