= SERPINE2 =

Protein-coding gene in the species Homo sapiens

Identifiers
- Aliases: SERPINE2, GDN, GDNPF, PI-7, PI7, PN-1, PN1, PNI, serpin family E member 2
- External IDs: OMIM: 177010; MGI: 101780; GeneCards: SERPINE2
Available structures
PDB	Ortholog search: PDBe RCSB
PDB	List of PDB id codes 4DY0, 4DY7

Gene location (Human)
Chr.	Chromosome 2 (human)
Band	2q36.1	Start	223,975,045 bp
Band	2q36.1	End	224,039,318 bp

Gene location (Mouse)
Chr.	Chromosome 1 (mouse)
Band	1 C4|1 40.97 cM	Start	79,771,914 bp
Band	1 C4|1 40.97 cM	End	79,838,897 bp
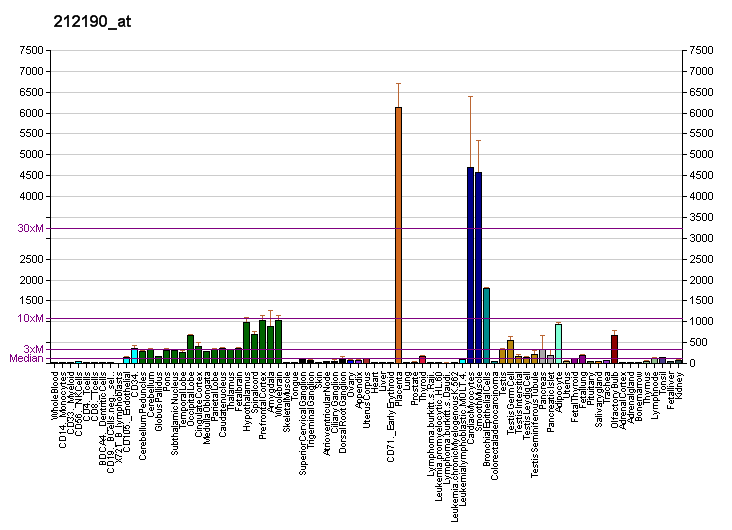
RNA expression pattern
Bgee	Human / Mouse (ortholog); Top expressed in: decidua; cartilage tissue; stromal cell of endometrium; ventral tegmental area; tibia; paraflocculus of cerebellum; spinal ganglia; external globus pallidus; trigeminal ganglion; superior vestibular nucleus / Top expressed in: seminal vesicula; tunica media of zone of aorta; calvaria; stroma of bone marrow; cumulus cell; olfactory epithelium; tibiofemoral joint; body of femur; ventral tegmental area; ciliary body; More reference expression data
BioGPS	More reference expression data
Gene ontology
Molecular function	protein binding; glycosaminoglycan binding; peptidase inhibitor activity; heparin binding; serine-type endopeptidase inhibitor activity; signaling receptor binding
Cellular component	extracellular vesicle; extrinsic component of external side of plasma membrane; platelet alpha granule; extracellular matrix; cytosol; neuromuscular junction; extracellular region; extracellular space; collagen-containing extracellular matrix
Biological process	negative regulation of phosphatidylinositol 3-kinase signaling; negative regulation of cell growth; seminal vesicle epithelium development; secretory granule organization; innervation; mating plug formation; nervous system development; detection of mechanical stimulus involved in sensory perception; multicellular organism development; regulation of cell migration; long-term potentiation; regulation of timing of cell differentiation; cell differentiation; negative regulation of proteolysis; negative regulation of protein catabolic process; negative regulation of plasminogen activation; cerebellar granular layer morphogenesis; negative regulation of cell population proliferation; secretion by cell; negative regulation of sodium ion transport; negative regulation of smoothened signaling pathway; negative regulation of protein processing; positive regulation of astrocyte differentiation; negative regulation of platelet activation; response to wounding; regulation of synaptic transmission, glutamatergic; negative regulation of peptidase activity; negative regulation of blood coagulation; blood coagulation; negative regulation of platelet aggregation; negative regulation of endopeptidase activity
Sources:Amigo / QuickGO
Orthologs
Databases	NCBI: entry; OMA: entry
Species	Human	Mouse
Entrez	5270	20720
Ensembl	ENSG00000135919	ENSMUSG00000026249
UniProt	P07093	Q07235
RefSeq (mRNA)	NM_001136528; NM_001136530; NM_006216	NM_009255
RefSeq (protein)	NP_001130000; NP_001130002; NP_006207	NP_033281
Location (UCSC)	Chr 2: 223.98 – 224.04 Mb	Chr 1: 79.77 – 79.84 Mb
PubMed search
- Wikidata
View/Edit Human	View/Edit Mouse

Glia-derived nexin is a protein that in humans is encoded by the SERPINE2 gene.

== See also ==
- Serpin
