= SERPINB6 =

Protein-coding gene in the species Homo sapiens

Identifiers
- Aliases: SERPINB6, CAP, DFNB91, MSTP057, PI-6, PI6, PTI, SPI3, serpin family B member 6
- External IDs: OMIM: 173321; MGI: 103123; GeneCards: SERPINB6
Available structures
PDB	Ortholog search: PDBe RCSB
PDB	List of PDB id codes 1M37

Gene location (Human)
Chr.	Chromosome 6 (human)
Band	6p25.2	Start	2,948,159 bp
Band	6p25.2	End	2,972,165 bp

Gene location (Mouse)
Chr.	Chromosome 13 (mouse)
Band	13 A3.3|13 14.0 cM	Start	34,101,901 bp
Band	13 A3.3|13 14.0 cM	End	34,186,777 bp
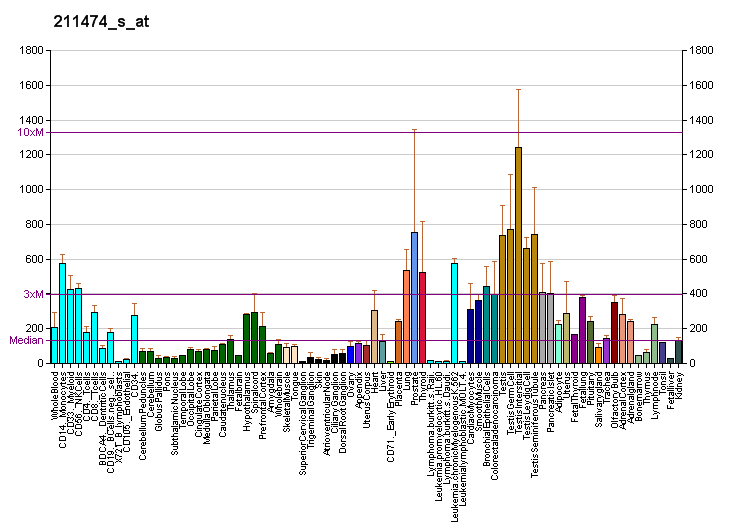
RNA expression pattern
Bgee	Human / Mouse (ortholog); Top expressed in: right testis; left testis; right uterine tube; body of pancreas; apex of heart; left ovary; right auricle of heart; right ovary; canal of the cervix; right adrenal gland / Top expressed in: stroma of bone marrow; ankle joint; endothelial cell of lymphatic vessel; Ileal epithelium; submandibular gland; esophagus; ovary; skin of external ear; umbilical cord; left colon; More reference expression data
BioGPS	More reference expression data
Gene ontology
Molecular function	peptidase inhibitor activity; protease binding; serine-type endopeptidase inhibitor activity
Cellular component	cytoplasm; cytosol; extracellular exosome; nucleus; extracellular space; plasma membrane; secretory granule membrane; tertiary granule membrane; ficolin-1-rich granule membrane; extracellular region; collagen-containing extracellular matrix; serine protease inhibitor complex
Biological process	negative regulation of peptidase activity; hearing; cellular response to osmotic stress; negative regulation of endopeptidase activity; neutrophil degranulation
Sources:Amigo / QuickGO
Orthologs
Databases	NCBI: entry; OMA: entry
Species	Human	Mouse
Entrez	5269	20719
Ensembl	ENSG00000124570	ENSMUSG00000060147
UniProt	P35237	Q60854
RefSeq (mRNA)	NM_001195291; NM_001271822; NM_001271823; NM_001271824; NM_001271825 NM_001297699; NM_001297700; NM_004568; NM_001374515; NM_001374516; NM_001374517	NM_001164117; NM_001164118; NM_001243192; NM_009254
RefSeq (protein)	NP_001182220; NP_001258751; NP_001258752; NP_001258753; NP_001258754 NP_001284628; NP_001284629; NP_004559; NP_001361444; NP_001361445; NP_001361446	NP_001157589; NP_001157590; NP_001230121; NP_033280
Location (UCSC)	Chr 6: 2.95 – 2.97 Mb	Chr 13: 34.1 – 34.19 Mb
PubMed search
- Wikidata
View/Edit Human	View/Edit Mouse

Serpin B6 is a protein that in humans is encoded by the SERPINB6 gene.

== See also ==
- Serpin
