= SERPINB4 =

Protein-coding gene in the species Homo sapiens

Identifiers
- Aliases: SERPINB4, LEUPIN, PI11, SCCA-2, SCCA1, SCCA2, serpin family B member 4
- External IDs: OMIM: 600518; MGI: 3573933; GeneCards: SERPINB4

Gene location (Human)
Chr.	Chromosome 18 (human)
Band	18q21.33	Start	63,637,259 bp
Band	18q21.33	End	63,644,256 bp

Gene location (Mouse)
Chr.	Chromosome 1 (mouse)
Band	1|1 E2.1	Start	106,973,317 bp
Band	1|1 E2.1	End	106,980,033 bp
RNA expression pattern
Bgee	Human / Mouse (ortholog); Top expressed in: nasal epithelium; vulva; mucosa of paranasal sinus; human penis; olfactory zone of nasal mucosa; epithelium of bronchus; bronchial epithelial cell; gums; gingival epithelium; oral cavity / Top expressed in: esophagus; superior surface of tongue; skin of external ear; lip; conjunctival fornix; trachea; secondary oocyte; molar; zygote; corneal stroma; More reference expression data
BioGPS	n/a
Gene ontology
Molecular function	peptidase inhibitor activity; protease binding; enzyme binding; serine-type endopeptidase inhibitor activity
Cellular component	cytoplasm; intracellular anatomical structure; extracellular space
Biological process	negative regulation of peptidase activity; regulation of proteolysis; protection from natural killer cell mediated cytotoxicity; negative regulation of endopeptidase activity
Sources:Amigo / QuickGO
Orthologs
Databases	NCBI: entry; OMA: entry
Species	Human	Mouse
Entrez	6318	20248
Ensembl	ENSG00000206073	ENSMUSG00000044594
UniProt	P48594	n/a
RefSeq (mRNA)	NM_002974; NM_175041	NM_009126
RefSeq (protein)	NP_002965; NP_778206	n/a
Location (UCSC)	Chr 18: 63.64 – 63.64 Mb	Chr 1: 106.97 – 106.98 Mb
PubMed search
- Wikidata
View/Edit Human	View/Edit Mouse

Serpin B4 is a protein that in humans is encoded by the SERPINB4 gene.

== See also ==
- Serpin
