= SERPINB7 =

Protein-coding gene in the species Homo sapiens

Identifiers
- Aliases: SERPINB7, MEGSIN, PPKN, TP55, serpin family B member 7
- External IDs: OMIM: 603357; MGI: 2151053; GeneCards: SERPINB7

Gene location (Human)
Chr.	Chromosome 18 (human)
Band	18q21.33	Start	63,752,935 bp
Band	18q21.33	End	63,805,376 bp

Gene location (Mouse)
Chr.	Chromosome 1 (mouse)
Band	1|1 E2.1	Start	107,327,385 bp
Band	1|1 E2.1	End	107,380,419 bp
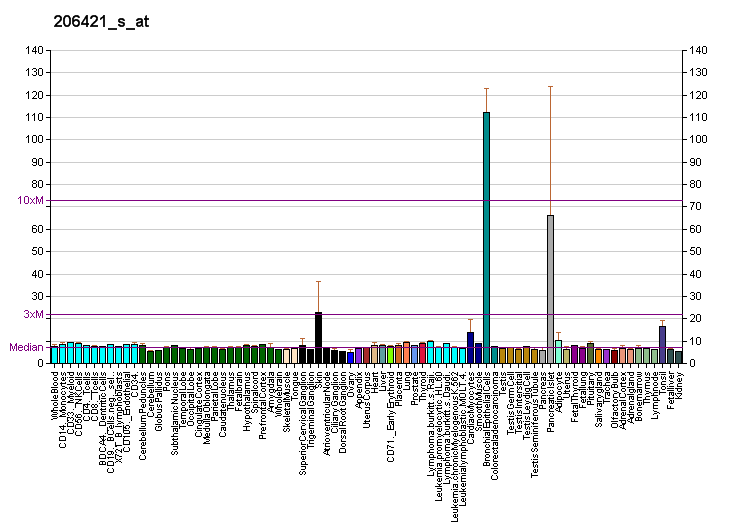
RNA expression pattern
Bgee	Human / Mouse (ortholog); Top expressed in: skin of arm; skin of leg; human penis; skin of abdomen; skin of thigh; skin of hip; epithelium of nasopharynx; vulva; testicle; bronchial epithelial cell / Top expressed in: skin of external ear; umbilical cord; skin of abdomen; skin of back; olfactory epithelium; lip; esophagus; condyle; fossa; cervix; More reference expression data
BioGPS	More reference expression data
Gene ontology
Molecular function	peptidase inhibitor activity; serine-type endopeptidase inhibitor activity
Cellular component	cytoplasm; extracellular space
Biological process	positive regulation of collagen biosynthetic process; positive regulation of transforming growth factor beta1 production; negative regulation of peptidase activity; positive regulation of glomerular mesangial cell proliferation; positive regulation of platelet-derived growth factor production; negative regulation of endopeptidase activity
Sources:Amigo / QuickGO
Orthologs
Databases	NCBI: entry; OMA: entry
Species	Human	Mouse
Entrez	8710	116872
Ensembl	ENSG00000166396	ENSMUSG00000067001
UniProt	O75635	Q9D695
RefSeq (mRNA)	NM_001040147; NM_001261830; NM_001261831; NM_003784	NM_027548
RefSeq (protein)	NP_001035237; NP_001248759; NP_001248760; NP_003775	NP_081824
Location (UCSC)	Chr 18: 63.75 – 63.81 Mb	Chr 1: 107.33 – 107.38 Mb
PubMed search
- Wikidata
View/Edit Human	View/Edit Mouse

Serpin B7 is a protein that in humans is encoded by the SERPINB7 gene.

== See also ==
- Serpin
