= Uterine serpin =

Serpin peptidase inhibitor, clade A (alpha-1 antiproteinase, antitrypsin), member 14

Identifiers
- Organism: Bos taurus (domestic cow)
- Symbol: SERPINA14
- Entrez: 286871
- Orthologs: NCBI: entry; OMA: entry
- RefSeq (mRNA): NM_174797
- RefSeq (Prot): NP_777222
- UniProt: P46201

Other data
- Chromosome: 21: 59.39 - 59.4 Mb
Search for
- Structures: Swiss-model
- Domains: InterPro

Uterine serpins are members of the A clade of the serine protease inhibitor (serpin) superfamily of proteins and are encoded by the SERPINA14 gene. Uterine serpins are produced by the endometrium of a restricted group of mammals under the influence of progesterone or estrogen. These proteins appear to be inactive protease inhibitors and may function during pregnancy to regulate immune function or participate in transplacental transport.

== Nomenclature ==
Uterine serpins were originally described in the uterine secretions of unilaterally-pregnant sheep as a pair of 57 kDa and 55 kDa glycoproteins. Termed uterine milk proteins, their identification as members of the serpin superfamily was based on sequencing of the cDNA for the sheep gene. The pig uterine serpin was first identified because of its association with an iron-binding uterine protein termed uteroferrin. and was originally termed uteroferrin-associated protein.

The designation of uterine serpins as SERPINA14 is based on their classification as a highly-divergent group of the α1-antitrypsin or A clade. In other analyses, uterine serpins have been considered as a separate clade in the serpin superfamily.

== Evolution ==
The uterine serpins are novel with respect to other serpins by virtue of their limited distribution among mammals. They have been described only in species of the Laurasiatheria superorder of eutherian mammals. Among the clades in which uterine serpin genes exist are the Cetartiodactyla (dolphin, cow, water buffalo, sheep, goat, pig), Perissodactyla (horse) and some carnivores (dog, giant panda) The uterine serpin gene is not expressed in all carnivores since the only uterine serpin identified in the cat is a pseudogene. Examination of completed genomes indicates that uterine serpin genes do not exist in primates, mouse, rat, rabbit, marsupials, platypus, chicken or zebrafish.

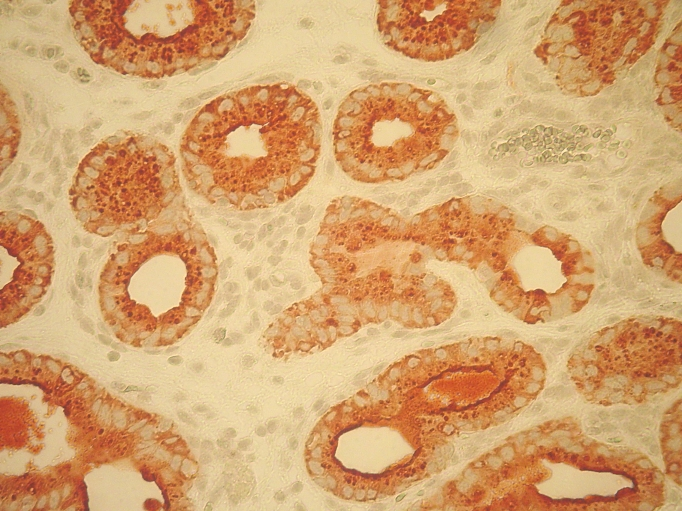
Figure 1. Immunohistochemical localization of uterine serpin in endometrial glands of an ovariectomized ewe treated with progesterone for 60 days.

== Cellular expression and hormone regulation ==
Uterine serpins are products of the endometrial epithelium (Figure 1). Gene expression is limited to epithelial cells of endometrial glands. Late in pregnancy, uterine serpin protein can be found in the lumenal epithelium as well, perhaps as glandular epithelial cells move to the uterine lumen.

The major regulator of uterine serpin gene expression is progesterone. In the cow, estrogen can also increase uterine serpin gene expression.

In addition to expression in the endometrium, bovine uterine serpin is also expressed in the ovary (follicles, corpus luteum, and cumulus-oocyte complex) and by cotyledons of the placenta.

== Protease inhibitory activity ==
There are two lines of evidence to indicate that uterine serpins do not function as protease inhibitors. Uterine serpins from the sheep and pig are not inhibitory towards a variety of proteases. In addition, several key amino acids in the hinge region of the reactive center loop which are important for protease inhibitory activity have not been conserved in uterine serpins. Bovine uterine serpin does inhibit pepsin but probably through a mechanism distinct from the prototypical mechanism used by serpins.

== Function during pregnancy ==
There are two possible biological roles for uterine serpins during pregnancy. The first is as a binding protein. Porcine uterine serpin binds non-covalently to uteroferrin in a way that stabilizes the iron-binding capacity of uteroferrin. Uteroferrin is transferred across the placenta where it gives up its iron to fetal transferrin. Ovine uterine serpin binds pregnancy-associated glycoproteins, which are inactive aspartic proteases secreted in large amounts by the ungulate placenta. Ovine uterine serpin also binds to activin, IgM and IgA.

Another possible role for uterine serpins is in the inhibition of immune cell proliferation during pregnancy to provide protection for the allogeneically-distinct conceptus. In particular, sheep uterine serpin can inhibit lymphocyte and natural killer cell function in vitro and reduce natural-killer cell mediated abortion in a mouse model.

== Genetics ==
A single nucleotide polymorphism at position 1269 of the bovine uterine serpin gene has been associated with productive life in cattle populations.
