= Kallistatin =

Protein-coding gene in the species Homo sapiens

SERPINA4

Identifiers
- Aliases: SERPINA4, KAL, KLST, KST, PI-4, PI4, kallistatin, serpin family A member 4
- External IDs: OMIM: 147935; GeneCards: SERPINA4

Gene location (Human)
Chr.	Chromosome 14 (human)
Band	14q32.13	Start	94,561,442 bp
Band	14q32.13	End	94,569,913 bp
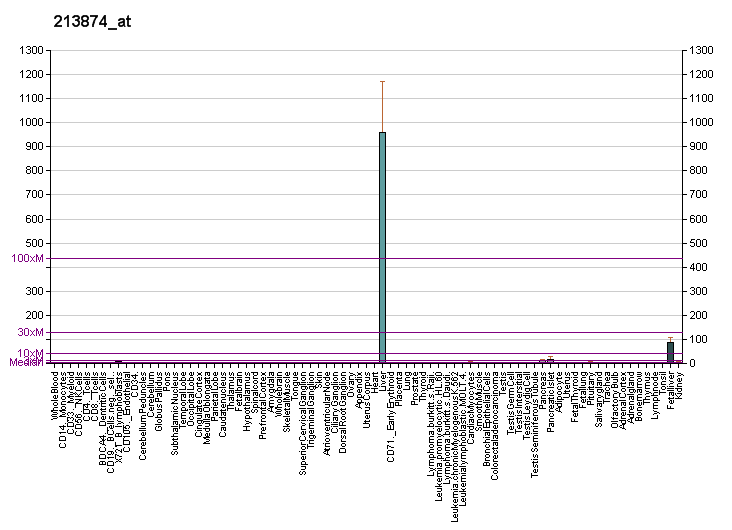
RNA expression pattern
Bgee	Human / Mouse (ortholog); Top expressed in: right lobe of liver; body of pancreas; gallbladder; islet of Langerhans; corpus epididymis; caput epididymis; body of stomach; seminal vesicula; tail of epididymis; tibialis anterior muscle / n/a; More reference expression data
BioGPS	More reference expression data
Gene ontology
Molecular function	peptidase inhibitor activity; serine-type endopeptidase inhibitor activity
Cellular component	extracellular exosome; platelet dense granule lumen; extracellular space; extracellular region
Biological process	negative regulation of peptidase activity; platelet degranulation; negative regulation of endopeptidase activity
Sources:Amigo / QuickGO
Orthologs
Databases	NCBI: entry; OMA: entry
Species	Human	Mouse
Entrez	5267	n/a
Ensembl	ENSG00000100665	n/a
UniProt	P29622	n/a
RefSeq (mRNA)	NM_006215; NM_001289032; NM_001289033	n/a
RefSeq (protein)	NP_001275961; NP_001275962; NP_006206	n/a
Location (UCSC)	Chr 14: 94.56 – 94.57 Mb	n/a
PubMed search		n/a
- Wikidata
View/Edit Human

Kallistatin is a protein that in humans is encoded by the SERPINA4 gene.

Kallistatin consists of three folded ß segments and eight helical structures and contains two functional domains, an active site and a heparin-binding site.

Kallistatin signals through several receptors, including integrin ß3, lipoprotein receptor-related protein 6 (LRP6), nucleolin, and Krüppel-like factor 4 (KLF4).

== See also ==
- Serpin
