= SERPINB9 =

Protein-coding gene in the species Homo sapiens

Identifiers
- Aliases: SERPINB9, CAP-3, CAP3, PI-9, PI9, serpin family B member 9
- External IDs: OMIM: 601799; MGI: 106603; GeneCards: SERPINB9

Gene location (Human)
Chr.	Chromosome 6 (human)
Band	6p25.2	Start	2,887,270 bp
Band	6p25.2	End	2,903,309 bp

Gene location (Mouse)
Chr.	Chromosome 13 (mouse)
Band	13 A3.2- A3.3|13 13.79 cM	Start	33,187,233 bp
Band	13 A3.2- A3.3|13 13.79 cM	End	33,201,940 bp
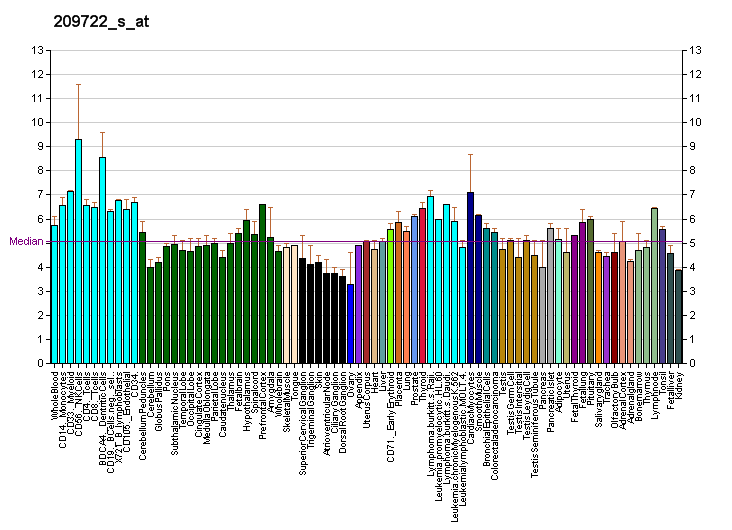

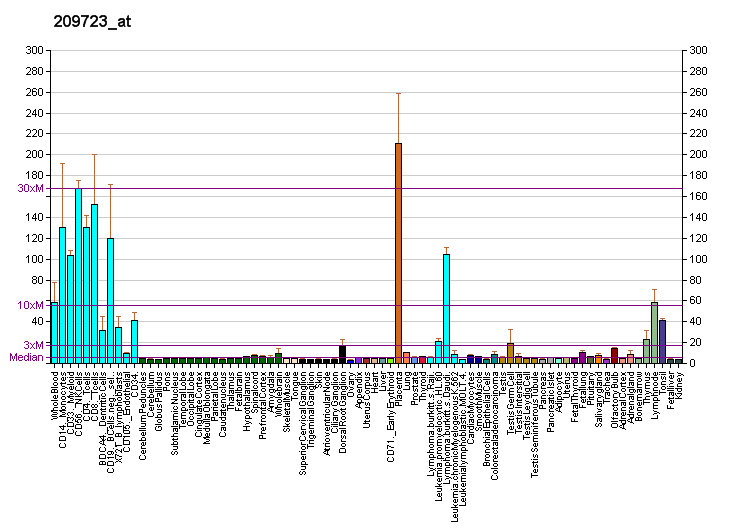
RNA expression pattern
Bgee	Human / Mouse (ortholog); Top expressed in: epithelium of nasopharynx; mononuclear cell; monocyte; germinal epithelium; appendix; lymph node; placenta; tibial nerve; blood; granulocyte / Top expressed in: right lung lobe; gastrula; left lung; mesenteric lymph nodes; left lung lobe; placenta; lumbar spinal ganglion; Epithelium of choroid plexus; carotid body; spleen; More reference expression data
BioGPS	More reference expression data
Gene ontology
Molecular function	peptidase inhibitor activity; cysteine-type endopeptidase inhibitor activity involved in apoptotic process; protease binding; protein binding; serine-type endopeptidase inhibitor activity
Cellular component	cytosol; membrane; intracellular anatomical structure; extracellular exosome; nucleus; cytoplasm; extracellular space; nucleoplasm; Golgi apparatus; collagen-containing extracellular matrix
Biological process	negative regulation of peptidase activity; mast cell mediated immunity; negative regulation of apoptotic process; protection from natural killer cell mediated cytotoxicity; cellular response to estrogen stimulus; positive regulation of gene expression; negative regulation by symbiont of host apoptotic process; immune response; negative regulation of endopeptidase activity; apoptotic process; negative regulation of cysteine-type endopeptidase activity involved in apoptotic process
Sources:Amigo / QuickGO
Orthologs
Databases	NCBI: entry; OMA: entry
Species	Human	Mouse
Entrez	5272	20723
Ensembl	ENSG00000170542	ENSMUSG00000045827
UniProt	P50453	O08797
RefSeq (mRNA)	NM_004155	NM_009256
RefSeq (protein)	NP_004146; NP_004146.1	NP_033282
Location (UCSC)	Chr 6: 2.89 – 2.9 Mb	Chr 13: 33.19 – 33.2 Mb
PubMed search
- Wikidata
View/Edit Human	View/Edit Mouse

Serpin B9 is a protein that in humans is encoded by the SERPINB9 gene. Serpin B9 is an inhibitor of Granzyme B (GzmB). GzmB is a potent cytotoxic molecule that is secreted by cytotoxic T lymphocytes and natural killer (NK) cells to induce apoptosis in target cells during an immune response. Serpin B9, expressed in the cytosol and nucleus, thus protects from apoptosis by cytotoxic T lymphocytes and NK cells.

Serpin B9 belongs to the large superfamily of serine proteinase inhibitors (serpins), which bind to and inactivate serine proteinases. These interactions are involved in many cellular processes, including coagulation, fibrinolysis, complement fixation, matrix remodeling, and apoptosis (Sprecher et al., 1995).[supplied by OMIM]

== See also ==
- Serpin
