= SERPINB13 =

Gene of the species Homo sapiens

Identifiers
- Aliases: SERPINB13, HSHUR7SEQ, HUR7, PI13, headpin, serpin family B member 13
- External IDs: OMIM: 604445; MGI: 3042250; GeneCards: SERPINB13

Gene location (Mouse)
Chr.	Chromosome 1 (mouse)
Band	1|1 E2.1	Start	106,908,714 bp
Band	1|1 E2.1	End	106,928,925 bp
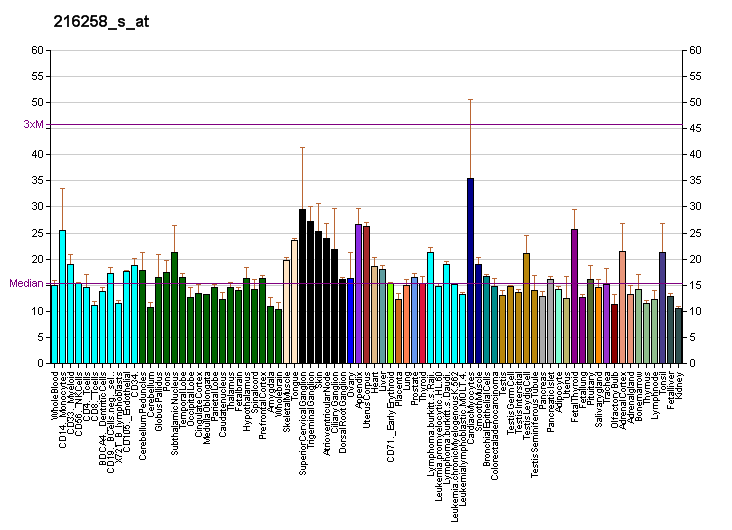

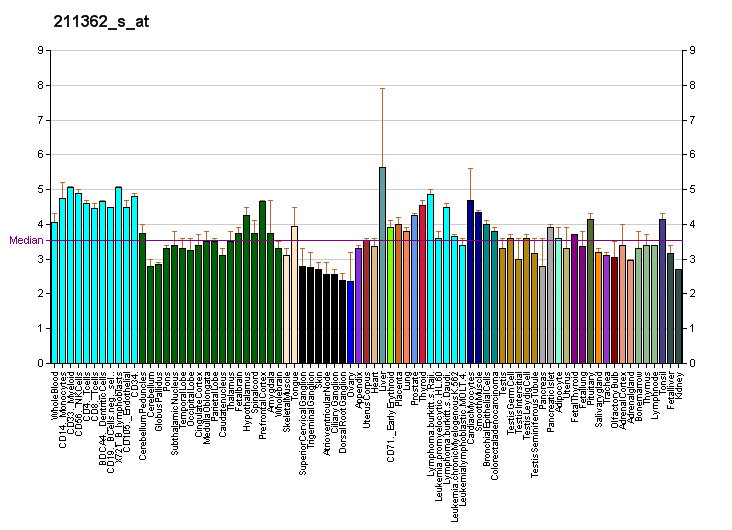

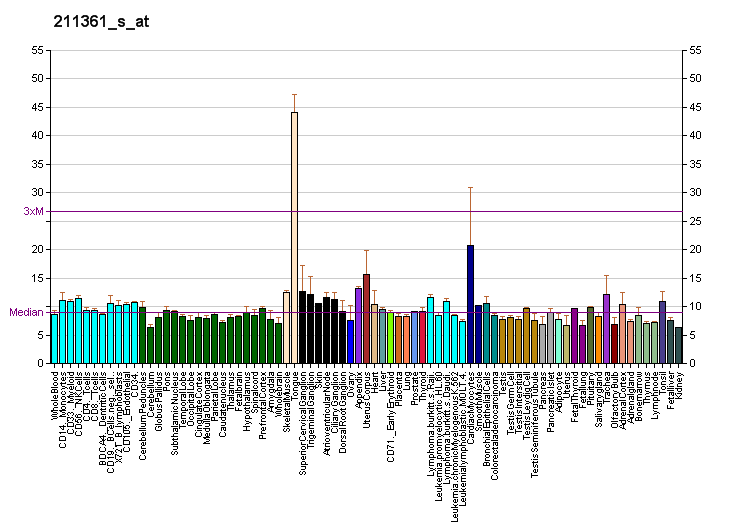
RNA expression pattern
Bgee	Human / Mouse (ortholog); n/a / Top expressed in: esophagus; lip; zone of skin; stomach
BioGPS	More reference expression data
Gene ontology
Molecular function	peptidase inhibitor activity; protease binding; cysteine-type endopeptidase inhibitor activity; serine-type endopeptidase inhibitor activity
Cellular component	cytoplasm; extracellular exosome; nucleolus; nucleoplasm; extracellular space; cytosol; nuclear speck; lysosomal lumen
Biological process	negative regulation of peptidase activity; response to UV; regulation of proteolysis; negative regulation of endopeptidase activity; negative regulation of keratinocyte apoptotic process; regulation of keratinocyte differentiation
Sources:Amigo / QuickGO
Orthologs
Databases	NCBI: entry; OMA: entry
Species	Human	Mouse
Entrez	5275	241196
Ensembl	ENSG00000197641	ENSMUSG00000048775
UniProt	Q9UIV8	Q8CDC0
RefSeq (mRNA)	NM_001307923; NM_012397	NM_172852
RefSeq (protein)	NP_001294852; NP_036529; NP_001335196; NP_001335197; NP_001335198 NP_001335199	NP_766440
Location (UCSC)	n/a	Chr 1: 106.91 – 106.93 Mb
PubMed search
- Wikidata
View/Edit Human	View/Edit Mouse

Serpin B13 is a protein that in humans is encoded by the SERPINB13 gene.

== See also ==
- Serpin
