= Maspin =

Protein-coding gene in the species Homo sapiens

SERPINB5
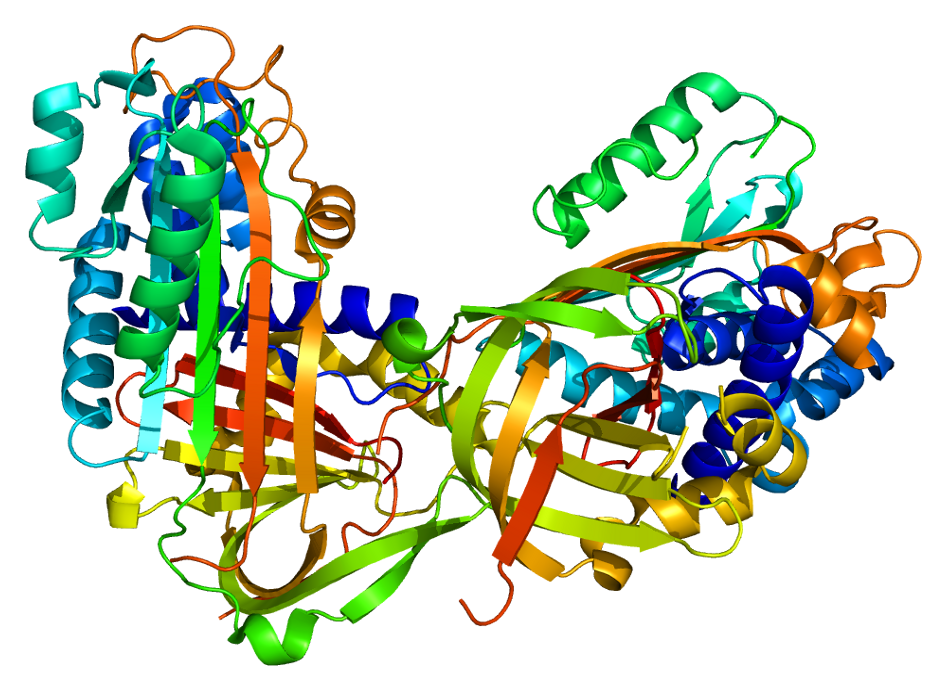

Identifiers
- Aliases: SERPINB5, PI5, maspin, serpin family B member 5
- External IDs: OMIM: 154790; MGI: 109579; GeneCards: SERPINB5
Available structures
PDB	Ortholog search: PDBe RCSB
PDB	List of PDB id codes 1WZ9, 1XQG, 1XQJ, 1XU8

Gene location (Human)
Chr.	Chromosome 18 (human)
Band	18q21.33	Start	63,476,958 bp
Band	18q21.33	End	63,505,085 bp

Gene location (Mouse)
Chr.	Chromosome 1 (mouse)
Band	1|1 E2.1	Start	106,788,903 bp
Band	1|1 E2.1	End	106,811,078 bp
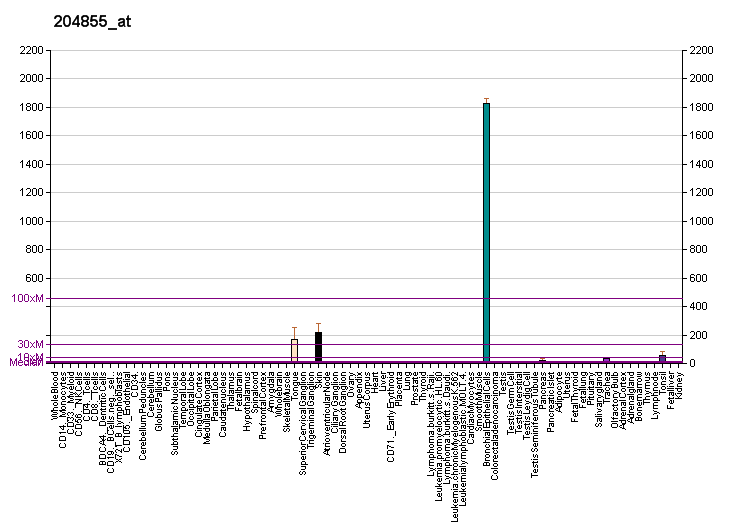
RNA expression pattern
Bgee	Human / Mouse (ortholog); Top expressed in: skin of abdomen; skin of leg; olfactory zone of nasal mucosa; skin of thigh; testicle; minor salivary glands; vagina; tonsil; human penis; appendix / Top expressed in: skin of external ear; hair follicle; esophagus; skin of back; corneal stroma; lip; conjunctival fornix; skin of abdomen; Eustachian tube; lumbar spinal ganglion; More reference expression data
BioGPS	More reference expression data
Gene ontology
Molecular function	protein binding; serine-type endopeptidase inhibitor activity
Cellular component	cytoplasm; extracellular region; extracellular space
Biological process	morphogenesis of an epithelium; extracellular matrix organization; regulation of epithelial cell proliferation; prostate gland morphogenesis; negative regulation of endopeptidase activity
Sources:Amigo / QuickGO
Orthologs
Databases	NCBI: entry; OMA: entry
Species	Human	Mouse
Entrez	5268	20724
Ensembl	ENSG00000206075	ENSMUSG00000067006
UniProt	P36952	P70124
RefSeq (mRNA)	NM_002639	NM_009257; NM_001360853; NM_001360854
RefSeq (protein)	NP_002630	NP_033283; NP_001347782; NP_001347783
Location (UCSC)	Chr 18: 63.48 – 63.51 Mb	Chr 1: 106.79 – 106.81 Mb
PubMed search
- Wikidata
View/Edit Human	View/Edit Mouse

Maspin (mammary serine protease inhibitor) is a protein that in humans is encoded by the SERPINB5 gene. This protein belongs to the serpin (serine protease inhibitor) superfamily. SERPINB5 was originally reported to function as a tumor suppressor gene in epithelial cells, suppressing the ability of cancer cells to invade and metastasize to other tissues. Furthermore, and consistent with an important biological function, Maspin knockout mice were reported to be non-viable, dying in early embryogenesis. However, a subsequent study using viral transduction as a method of gene transfer (rather than single cell cloning) was not able to reproduce the original findings and found no role for maspin in tumour biology. Furthermore, the latter study demonstrated that maspin knockout mice are viable and display no obvious phenotype. These data are consistent with the observation that maspin is not expressed in early embryogenesis. The precise molecular function of maspin is thus currently unknown.

== Tissue distribution ==
Maspin is expressed in the skin, prostate, testis, intestine, tongue, lung, and the thymus.

== Serpin superfamily ==
Maspin is a member of the serpin superfamily of serine protease inhibitors. The primary function of most members of this family is to regulate the breakdown of proteins by inhibiting the catalytic activity of proteinases. Through this mechanism of action, serpins regulate a number of cellular processes including phagocytosis, coagulation, and fibrinolysis.

Serpins have a complex structure, a key component of which is the reactive site loop, RSL. Inhibitory serpins transition between a stress and relaxed stage. The catalytic serine residue in the protease target attacks the stressed conformation of the RSL loop to form an acyl intermediate. The loop then undergoes a conformational change to the relaxed state irreversibly trapping the protease in an inactive state. Hence the serpin functions as a suicide inhibitor of the protease. This transition does not occur in serpins that lack inhibitory activity.

== Function ==
Given its original reported role in cancer biology, numerous studies have investigated a role for maspin in tumour metastasis. However, to date no detailed molecular mechanism for maspin function in cell proliferation or tumour biology has been comprehensively described. Further, it is suggested that original reports of maspin as a tumor suppressor may reflect clonal artefacts rather than true maspin function. Importantly, and in contrast to original reports, maspin knockout mice are viable, displaying no overt phenotype in the absence of suitable biological or environmental challenge. Accordingly, the molecular function of maspin remains unclear.

From a structural perspective, maspin is a non-inhibitory and obligate intracellular member of the serpin superfamily. Specifically, its RSL does not transition between a stressed and relaxed state following proteolytic cleavage. This region is also shorter than the RSL loop in other serpins. Accordingly, in the absence of an obvious protease-related function, other targets of maspin have been suggested. For example, rather than being a protease inhibitor, maspin is proposed to function as an inhibitor of histone deacetylase 1 (HDAC1).

== Clinical significance ==
A comprehensive analysis of maspin expression in breast cancer revealed no significant correlation between maspin expression and overall survival, distant metastasis-free survival or recurrence-free survival. Changes in maspin expression may, however, reflect the expression status of the known tumour suppressor PHLPP1.
