= SERPINI2 =

Protein-coding gene in the species Homo sapiens

Identifiers
- Aliases: SERPINI2, MEPI, PANCPIN, PI14, TSA2004, serpin family I member 2
- External IDs: OMIM: 605587; MGI: 1915181; GeneCards: SERPINI2

Gene location (Human)
| Chr. | Chromosome 3 (human) |
| Band | 3q26.1 | Start | 167,441,914 bp |
| Band | 3q26.1 | End | 167,478,972 bp |

Gene location (Mouse)
| Chr. | Chromosome 3 (mouse) |
| Band | 3|3 E3 | Start | 75,149,677 bp |
| Band | 3|3 E3 | End | 75,177,385 bp |
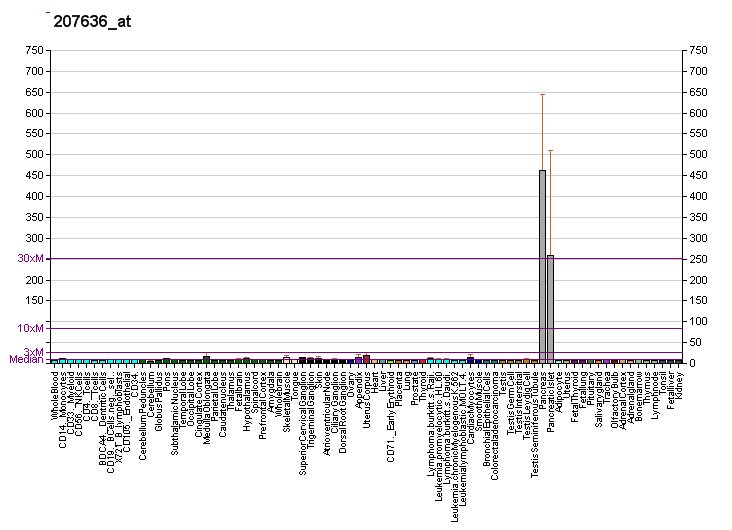
RNA expression pattern
| Bgee | Human / Mouse (ortholog); Top expressed in: body of pancreas; right uterine tube; bronchial epithelial cell; testicle; islet of Langerhans; olfactory zone of nasal mucosa; pancreatic epithelial cell; mucosa of paranasal sinus; monocyte; caudate nucleus / Top expressed in: pyloric antrum; pancreas; islet of Langerhans; embryo; embryo; migratory enteric neural crest cell; duodenum; right ventricle; lumbar subsegment of spinal cord; spermatid; More reference expression data |
| BioGPS | More reference expression data |
Gene ontology
| Molecular function | peptidase inhibitor activity; protein binding; serine-type endopeptidase inhibitor activity |
| Cellular component | extracellular region; extracellular exosome; extracellular space |
| Biological process | negative regulation of peptidase activity; negative regulation of endopeptidase activity |
Sources:Amigo / QuickGO
Orthologs
| Databases | NCBI: entry; OMA: entry |
| Species | Human | Mouse |
| Entrez | 5276 | 67931 |
| Ensembl | ENSG00000114204 | ENSMUSG00000034139 |
| UniProt | O75830 | Q9JK88 |
| RefSeq (mRNA) | NM_006217; NM_001012303; NM_001394327 | NM_026460 |
| RefSeq (protein) | NP_001012303; NP_006208 | NP_080736 |
| Location (UCSC) | Chr 3: 167.44 – 167.48 Mb | Chr 3: 75.15 – 75.18 Mb |
| PubMed search |
- Wikidata
| View/Edit Human | View/Edit Mouse |

Serpin I2 is a protein that in humans is encoded by the SERPINI2 gene.

== Function ==
The protein encoded by this gene is a member of the serine protease inhibitor (serpin) superfamily made up of proteins which play central roles in the regulation of a wide variety of physiological processes, including coagulation, fibrinolysis, development, malignancy and inflammation. The gene product may have a role in a growth-control, possibly growth-suppressing pathway and, when impaired, may be involved in pancreatic carcinogenesis. The protein is a member of the plasminogen activator inhibitor-1 family, a subset of the serpin superfamily whose members act as tissue-specific tPA inhibitors. Two alternatively spliced transcript variants encoding distinct protein isoforms have been found for this gene.
