= Serpin H1 =

Protein found in humans

SERPINH1

Identifiers
- Aliases: SERPINH1, AsTP3, CBP1, CBP2, HSP47, OI10, PIG14, PPROM, RA-A47, SERPINH2, gp46, serpin family H member 1
- External IDs: OMIM: 600943; MGI: 88283; GeneCards: SERPINH1

Gene location (Human)
Chr.	Chromosome 11 (human)
Band	11q13.5	Start	75,562,056 bp
Band	11q13.5	End	75,572,783 bp

Gene location (Mouse)
Chr.	Chromosome 7 (mouse)
Band	7|7 E1	Start	98,994,583 bp
Band	7|7 E1	End	99,002,446 bp
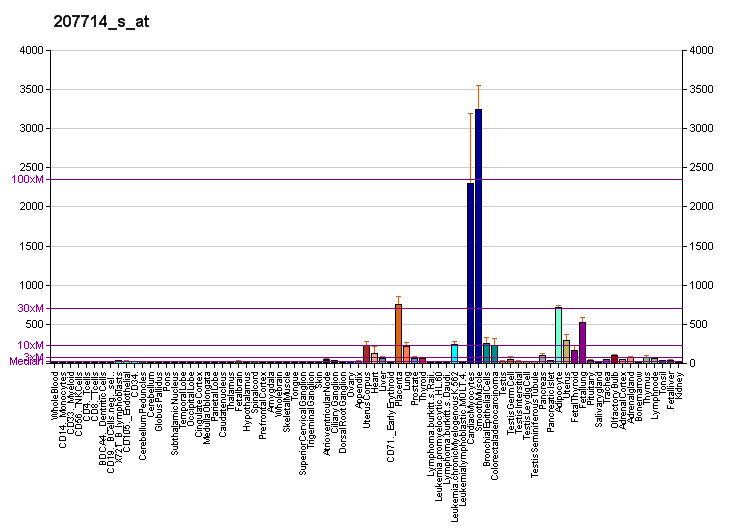
RNA expression pattern
Bgee	Human / Mouse (ortholog); Top expressed in: stromal cell of endometrium; smooth muscle tissue; pericardium; right coronary artery; ascending aorta; left uterine tube; cartilage tissue; body of uterus; right ovary; upper lobe of left lung / Top expressed in: dermis; molar; ascending aorta; calvaria; aortic valve; atrium; body of femur; umbilical cord; hand; maxillary prominence; More reference expression data
BioGPS	More reference expression data
Gene ontology
Molecular function	unfolded protein binding; collagen binding; RNA binding; serine-type endopeptidase inhibitor activity
Cellular component	cytoplasm; membrane raft; endoplasmic reticulum lumen; extracellular exosome; endoplasmic reticulum-Golgi intermediate compartment; extracellular space; endoplasmic reticulum; collagen-containing extracellular matrix
Biological process	response to unfolded protein; protein maturation; chondrocyte development involved in endochondral bone morphogenesis; collagen biosynthetic process; collagen fibril organization; negative regulation of endopeptidase activity
Sources:Amigo / QuickGO
Orthologs
Databases	NCBI: entry; OMA: entry
Species	Human	Mouse
Entrez	871	12406
Ensembl	ENSG00000149257	ENSMUSG00000070436
UniProt	P50454	P19324
RefSeq (mRNA)	NM_001207014; NM_001235	NM_001111043; NM_001111044; NM_009825; NM_001285776
RefSeq (protein)	NP_001193943; NP_001226	NP_001104513; NP_001104514; NP_001272705; NP_033955
Location (UCSC)	Chr 11: 75.56 – 75.57 Mb	Chr 7: 98.99 – 99 Mb
PubMed search
- Wikidata
View/Edit Human	View/Edit Mouse

Serpin H1, also called 47 kDa heat shock protein (HSP47), is protein that in humans is encoded by the SERPINH1 gene. It is a serpin which serves as a human chaperone protein for collagen.

== Structure ==
HSP47 contains 3 beta sheets and 9 alpha helices. After binding with collagen no conformation change is observed.

== Function ==
This protein is a member of the serpin superfamily of serine proteinase inhibitors. Its expression is induced by heat shock. HSP47 is expressed in the endoplasmic reticulum. These cells synthesize and secrete type I and type II collagen. The protein localizes to the endoplasmic reticulum lumen and binds collagen; thus it is thought to be a molecular chaperone involved in the maturation of collagen molecules. HSP47 is essential for the correct folding of procollagen. Antibodies directed to this protein have been found in patients with rheumatoid arthritis.

== Interactions ==
Heat shock protein 47 has been shown to interact with collagens I, II, III, IV and V. It is involved in the secretion of collagen as well as the processing, assembly, and folding of collagen proteins. Hsp 47 binds specifically to procollagen and collagen only. The protein recognizes the triple helix of procollagen, two HSP47 proteins will bind to the leading and trailing strands of procollagen.

== Clinical significance ==
=== Fibrosis ===
Fibrosis is the scarring of connective tissue, one attribute is the excess deposition of collagen in the extracellular matrix of tissue. Research has shown that HSPs have a role in fibrotic diseases. HSP47 has been shown to be pro-fibrosis in various fibrotic diseases. During the process of fibrosis, HSP47 is expressed and is involved in the production of collagen. HSP47 could be a potential therapeutic agent for fibrotic disease, a down-regulation of HSP47 leads to decreased fibrotic progression.

=== Deep vein thrombosis ===
HSP47 has a potential role in deep vein thrombosis.
