= Myeloid and erythroid nuclear termination stage-specific protein =

Protein found in humans

SERPINB10

Identifiers
- Aliases: SERPINB10, PI-10, PI10, serpin family B member 10
- External IDs: OMIM: 602058; MGI: 2138648; GeneCards: SERPINB10

Gene location (Human)
Chr.	Chromosome 18 (human)
Band	18q22.1	Start	63,897,174 bp
Band	18q22.1	End	63,936,111 bp

Gene location (Mouse)
Chr.	Chromosome 1 (mouse)
Band	1|1 E2.1	Start	107,456,757 bp
Band	1|1 E2.1	End	107,477,001 bp
RNA expression pattern
Bgee	Human / Mouse (ortholog); Top expressed in: bone marrow; bone marrow cell; testicle; monocyte; trabecular bone; epithelium of bronchus; olfactory zone of nasal mucosa; stromal cell of endometrium; blood; bronchial epithelial cell / Top expressed in: lobe of liver; granulocyte; epidermis; esophagus; zone of skin; lip; bone marrow; spleen; white adipose tissue; thymus; More reference expression data
BioGPS	n/a
Gene ontology
Molecular function	peptidase inhibitor activity; serine-type endopeptidase inhibitor activity
Cellular component	cytoplasm; extracellular space; plasma membrane; secretory granule membrane; ficolin-1-rich granule membrane; nucleus
Biological process	negative regulation of peptidase activity; negative regulation of endopeptidase activity; neutrophil degranulation; negative regulation of apoptotic process
Sources:Amigo / QuickGO
Orthologs
Databases	NCBI: entry; OMA: entry
Species	Human	Mouse
Entrez	5273	241197
Ensembl	ENSG00000242550	ENSMUSG00000092572
UniProt	P48595	Q8K1K6
RefSeq (mRNA)	NM_005024	NM_001160307; NM_198028
RefSeq (protein)	NP_005015	NP_001153779; NP_932145
Location (UCSC)	Chr 18: 63.9 – 63.94 Mb	Chr 1: 107.46 – 107.48 Mb
PubMed search
- Wikidata
View/Edit Human	View/Edit Mouse

Myeloid and erythroid nuclear termination stage-specific protein (MENT) is a protein that in humans is encoded by the SERPINB10 gene. MENT is a member of the serpin family of protease inhibitors, and participates in DNA and chromatin condensation. Alongside its ability to condense chromatin, MENT is also an effective inhibitor of the proteases cathepsin K, cathepsin L, and cathepsin V, all of which are cysteine proteases. As such, although MENT is structurally classified as a member of the serpin family, it is functionally termed a "cross-class inhibitor," as it is a cysteine rather than a serine protease inhibitor.
