= Egg allergy =

Type of food allergy caused by eggs

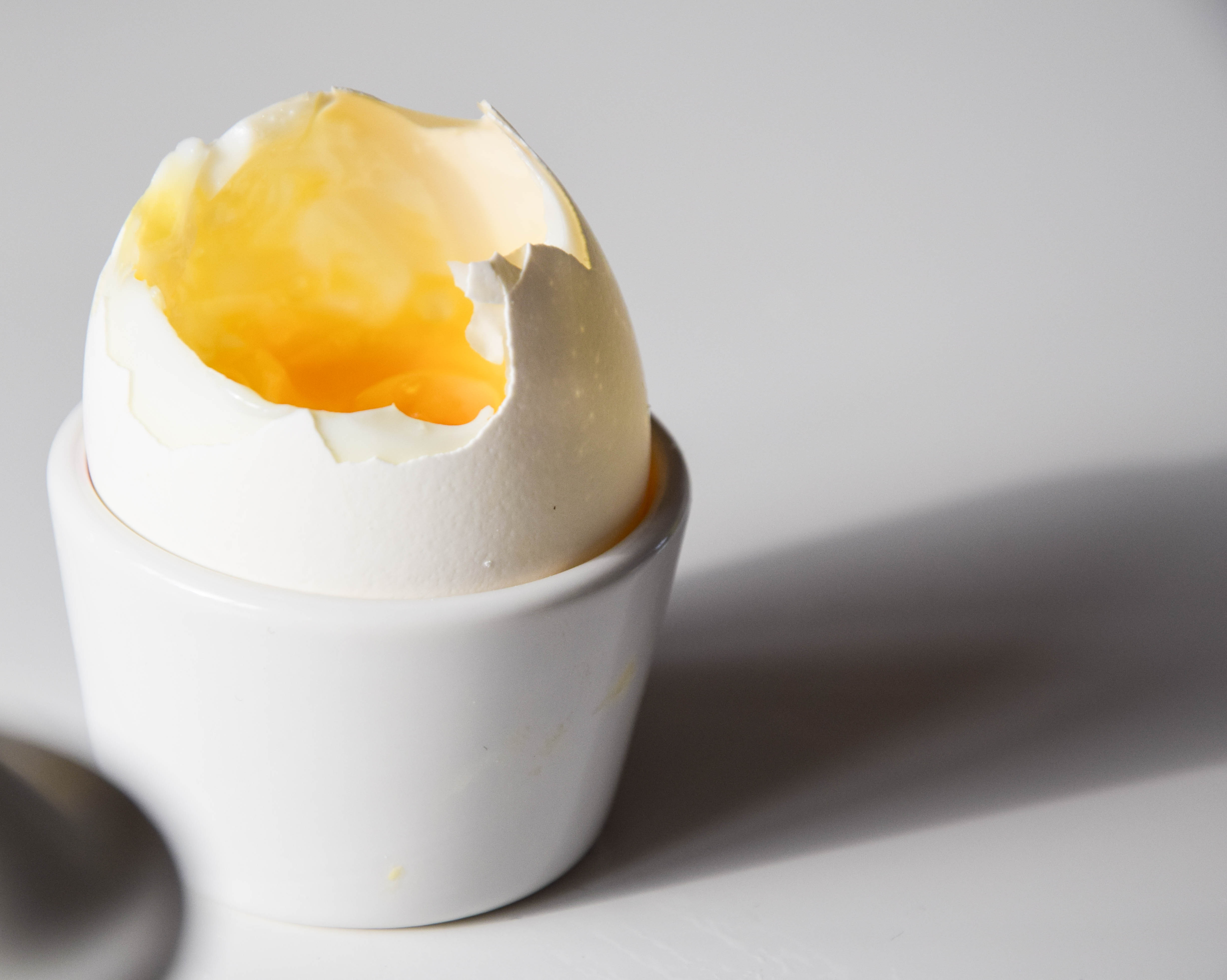
- A boiled chicken egg
- Specialty: Emergency medicine Allergy & immunology
- Symptoms: itchiness, rash, swelling of lips, tongue or the whole face, eczema, wheezing and shortness of breath, nausea, vomiting, abdominal pain, diarrhea, anaphylaxis
- Causes: Type I hypersensitivity
- Risk factors: Consumption of chicken eggs, and also of baked goods that have eggs in the recipe.
- Diagnostic method: Medical history and standard allergy tests
- Prevention: Introduction to allergenic foods during infancy
- Treatment: Epinephrine; Antihistamines (mild)
- Prognosis: Less than 30% of childhood egg allergies will persist into adulthood.
- Frequency: In developed countries, the prevalence of egg allergy in children under the age of five years is 1.8-2.0%.

Egg allergy is an immune hypersensitivity to proteins found in chicken eggs, and possibly goose, duck, or turkey eggs. Symptoms can be either rapid or gradual in onset. The latter can take hours to days to appear. The former may include anaphylaxis, a potentially life-threatening condition which requires treatment with epinephrine. Other presentations may include atopic dermatitis or inflammation of the esophagus.

In the United States, 90% of allergic responses to foods are caused by cow's milk, eggs, wheat, shellfish, peanuts, tree nuts, fish, soybeans, and sesame seeds. The declaration of the presence of trace amounts of allergens in foods is not mandatory in any country, except for Brazil.

Prevention is by avoiding eating eggs and foods that may contain eggs, such as cake or cookies. It is unclear if the early introduction of the eggs to the diet of babies aged 4–6 months decreases the risk of egg allergies.

Egg allergy appears mainly in children but can persist into adulthood. In the United States, it is the second most common food allergy in children after cow's milk. Most children outgrow egg allergy by the age of five, but some people remain allergic for a lifetime. In North America and Western Europe, egg allergy occurs in 0.5% to 2.5% of children under the age of five years. The majority grow out of it by school age, but for roughly one-third, the allergy persists into adulthood. Strong predictors for adult-persistence are anaphylaxis, high egg-specific serum immunoglobulin E (IgE), robust response to the skin prick test, and absence of tolerance to egg-containing baked foods.

== Signs and symptoms ==
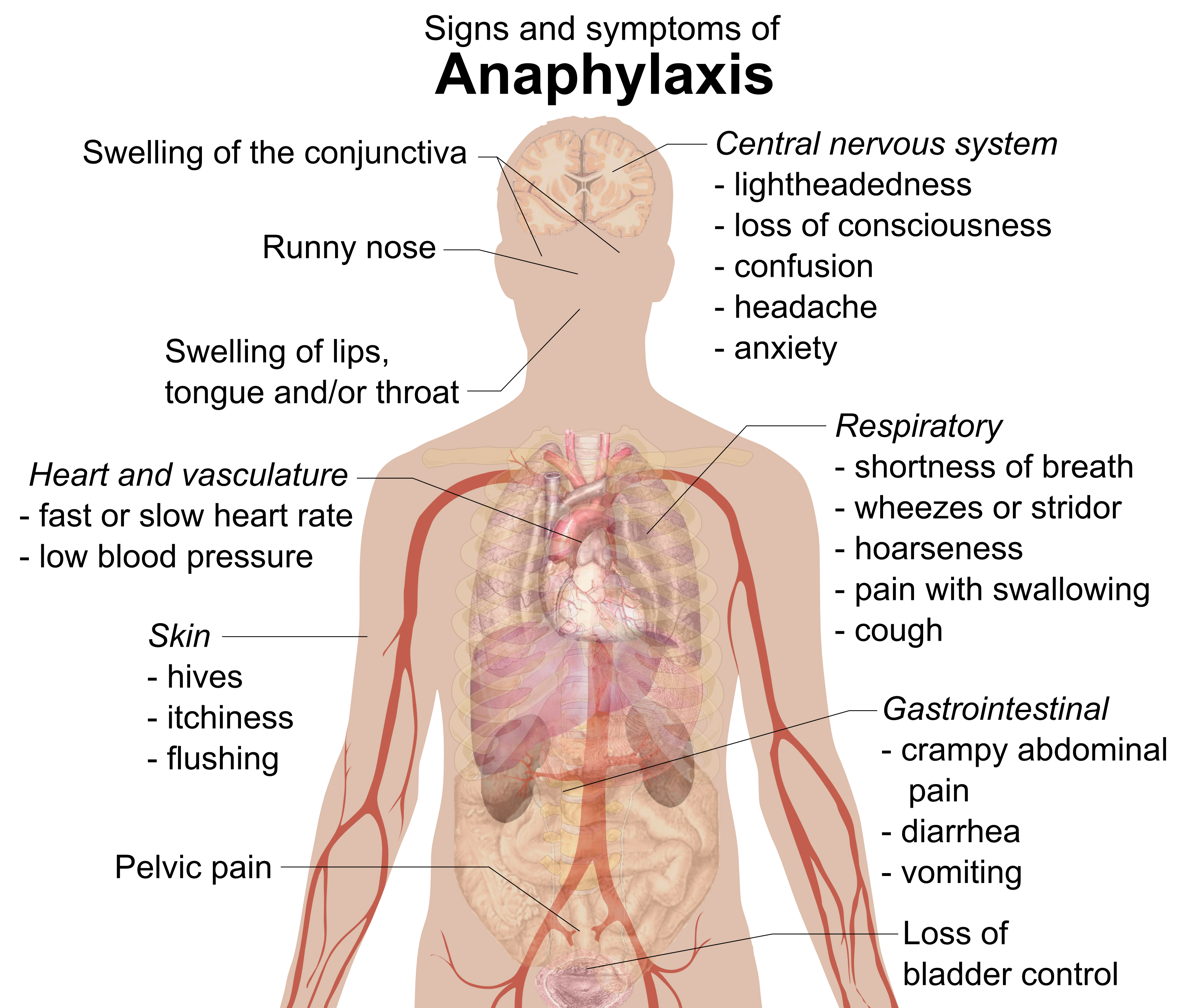
Signs and symptoms of anaphylaxis

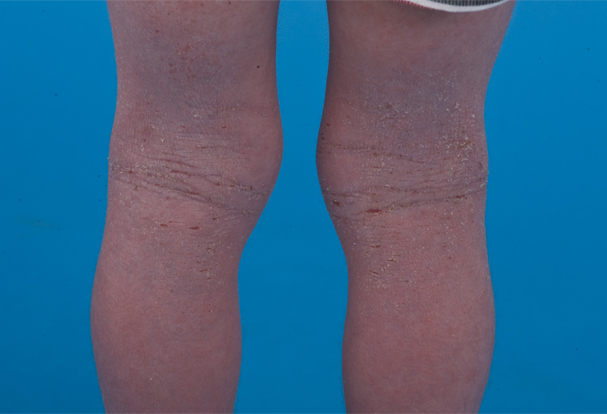
Eczema present at backs of knees

Food allergies usually have an onset from minutes to one to two hours. Symptoms may include: rash, hives, itching of mouth, lips, tongue, throat, eyes, skin, or other areas, swelling of lips, tongue, eyelids, or the whole face, difficulty swallowing, runny or congested nose, hoarse voice, wheezing, shortness of breath, diarrhea, abdominal pain, lightheadedness, fainting, nausea, or vomiting. Symptoms of allergies vary from person to person and may vary from incident to incident. Serious danger regarding allergies can begin when the respiratory tract or blood circulation is affected. Wheezing, a blocked airway, and cyanosis can indicate the former, whereas a weak pulse, pale skin, and fainting can indicate the latter. When these symptoms occur, the allergic reaction is called anaphylaxis. Anaphylaxis occurs when IgE antibodies are involved, and areas of the body that are not in direct contact with the food become affected and show severe symptoms. Untreated, this can proceed to vasodilation and a low blood pressure situation called anaphylactic shock.

Young children may exhibit dermatitis/eczema on the face, scalp, and other parts of the body; in older children, knees and elbows are more commonly affected. Children with dermatitis are at a greater than expected risk of also exhibiting asthma and allergic rhinitis.

== Causes ==
=== Eating egg ===
The cause is typically the eating of eggs or foods that contain eggs. Briefly, the immune system overreacts to proteins found in eggs. This allergic reaction may be triggered by small amounts of egg, even egg incorporated into cooked foods, such as cake. People with an allergy to chicken eggs may also be reactive to goose, duck, or turkey eggs.

=== Vaccines ===
Influenza vaccines are created by injecting a live virus into fertilized chicken eggs. The viruses are harvested, killed and purified, but a residual amount of egg white protein remains. For adults ages 18 and older, there is an option to receive recombinant flu vaccines (RIV3 or RIV4), which are grown on mammalian cell cultures instead of in eggs, and so are not a risk for people with severe egg allergy. Recommendations are that people with a history of mild egg allergy should receive any IIV or RIV vaccine. People with a more severe allergic reaction may also receive any IIV or RIV, but in an inpatient or outpatient medical setting, administered by a healthcare provider. People with a known severe allergic reaction to influenza vaccine (which could be egg protein, gelatin, or the neomycin components of the vaccine) should not receive a flu vaccine.

Each year the American Academy of Pediatrics (AAP) publishes recommendations for the prevention and control of influenza in children. In the 2016-2017 guidelines, a change was made that children with a history of egg allergy may receive the IIV3 or IIV4 vaccine without special precautions. It did, however, state that "Standard vaccination practice should include the ability to respond to acute hypersensitivity reactions." Before this, AAP recommended precautions based on egg allergy history: if no history, immunize; if a history of mild reaction, i.e., hives, immunize in a medical setting with healthcare professionals and resuscitative equipment available; if a history of severe reactions, refer to an allergist.

The measles and mumps parts of the "MMR vaccine" (for measles, mumps, and rubella) are cultured on chick embryo cell culture and contain trace amounts of egg protein. The amount of egg protein is lower than in influenza vaccines, and the risk of an allergic reaction is much lower. One guideline stated that all infants and children should get the two MMR vaccinations, mentioning that "Studies on large numbers of egg-allergic children show there is no increased risk of severe allergic reactions to the vaccines." Another guideline recommended that if a child has a known medical history of severe anaphylaxis reaction to eggs, then the vaccination should be done in a hospital center, and the child be kept for observation for 60 minutes before being allowed to leave. The second guideline also stated that if there was a severe reaction to the first vaccination - which could have been to egg protein or the gelatin and neomycin components of the vaccine - the second is contraindicated.

=== Exercise as a contributing factor ===
There is a condition called food-dependent, exercise-induced anaphylaxis (FDEIAn). Exercise can trigger hives and more severe symptoms of an allergic reaction. For some people with this condition, exercise alone is not sufficient, nor consumption of a food to which they are mildly allergic sufficient, but when the food in question is consumed within a few hours before high-intensity exercise, the result can be anaphylaxis. Eggs are specifically mentioned as a causative food. One theory is that exercise is stimulating the release of mediators such as histamine from IgE-activated mast cells. Two of the reviews postulate that exercise is not essential for the development of symptoms, but rather that it is one of several augmentation factors, citing evidence that the culprit food in combination with alcohol or aspirin will result in a respiratory anaphylactic reaction.

== Mechanisms ==
Conditions caused by food allergies are classified into three groups according to the mechanism of the allergic response:

1. IgE-mediated (classic) – the most common type, manifesting acute changes that occur shortly after eating, and may progress to anaphylaxis
2. Non-IgE mediated – characterized by an immune response not involving immunoglobulin E; may occur hours to days after eating, complicating diagnosis
3. IgE and non-IgE-mediated – a hybrid of the above two types

Allergic reactions are hyperactive responses of the immune system to generally innocuous substances, such as proteins in the foods we eat. Why some proteins trigger allergic reactions while others do not is not entirely clear, although in part thought to be due to resistance to digestion. Because of this, intact or largely intact proteins reach the small intestine, which has a large presence of white blood cells involved in immune reactions. The heat of cooking structurally degrades protein molecules, potentially making them less allergenic.

Hives allergic reaction on arm

The pathophysiology of allergic responses can be divided into two phases. The first is an acute response that occurs within minutes to an hour or two of exposure to an allergen. This phase can either subside or progress into a "late-phase reaction," which can substantially prolong the symptoms of a response and result in more tissue damage. In the early stages of acute allergic reaction, lymphocytes previously sensitized to a specific protein or protein fraction react by quickly producing a particular type of antibody known as secreted IgE (sIgE), which circulates in the blood and binds to IgE-specific receptors on the surface of other kinds of immune cells called mast cells and basophils. Both of these are involved in the acute inflammatory response. Activated mast cells and basophils undergo a process called degranulation, during which they release histamine and other inflammatory chemical mediators called (cytokines, interleukins, leukotrienes, and prostaglandins) into the surrounding tissue causing several systemic effects, such as vasodilation, mucous secretion, nerve stimulation, and smooth-muscle contraction. This results in runny nose, itchiness, shortness of breath, and potentially anaphylaxis. Depending on the individual, the allergen, and the mode of introduction, the symptoms can be system-wide (classical anaphylaxis) or localized to particular body systems; asthma is localized to the respiratory system while eczema is localized to the skin.

After the chemical mediators of the acute response subside, late-phase responses can often occur due to the migration of other white blood cells such as neutrophils, lymphocytes, eosinophils, and macrophages to the initial reaction sites. This is usually seen 2–24 hours after the original reaction. Cytokines from mast cells may also play a role in the persistence of long-term effects. Late-phase responses seen in asthma are slightly different from those seen in other allergic responses, although they are still caused by the release of mediators from eosinophils.

Five major allergenic proteins from the egg of the domestic chicken (Gallus domesticus) have been identified; these are designated Gal d 1–5. Four of these are in egg white: ovomucoid (Gal d 1), ovalbumin (Gal d 2), ovotransferrin (Gal d 3), and lysozyme (Gal d 4). Of these, ovomucoid is the dominant allergen, and one that is less likely to be outgrown as children get older. Ingestion of under-cooked egg may trigger more severe clinical reactions than well-cooked egg. In egg yolk, alpha-livetin (Gal d 5) is the major allergen, but various vitellins may also trigger a reaction. People allergic to alpha-livetin may experience respiratory symptoms such as rhinitis and/or asthma when exposed to chickens, because the yolk protein is also found in live birds. In addition to IgE-mediated responses, egg allergy can manifest as atopic dermatitis, especially in infants and young children. Some will display both, so that a child could react to an oral food challenge with allergic symptoms, followed a day or two later with a flare-up of atopic dermatitis and/or gastrointestinal symptoms, including allergic eosinophilic esophagitis.

=== Non-allergic intolerance ===
Egg whites, which are potentially histamine liberators, also provoke a nonallergic response in some people. In this situation, proteins in egg white directly trigger the release of histamine from mast cells. Because this mechanism is classified as a pharmacological reaction, or "pseudoallergy", the condition is considered a food intolerance instead of a true immunoglobulin E (IgE) based allergic reaction.

The response is usually localized, typically in the gastrointestinal tract. Symptoms may include abdominal pain, diarrhea, or any other symptoms typical of histamine release. If sufficiently strong, it can result in an anaphylactoid reaction, which is clinically indistinguishable from true anaphylaxis. Some people with this condition tolerate small quantities of egg whites. They are more often able to tolerate well-cooked eggs, such as found in cake or dried egg-based pasta, than incompletely cooked eggs, such as fried eggs or meringues, or uncooked eggs.

== Diagnosis ==
Diagnosis of egg allergy is based on the person's history of allergic reactions, skin prick test (SPT), patch test, and measurement of egg-specific serum immunoglobulin E (IgE or sIgE). Confirmation is by double-blind, placebo-controlled food challenges. SPT and sIgE have sensitivity greater than 90% but specificity in the 50-60% range, meaning these tests will detect an egg sensitivity, but will also be positive for other allergens. For young children, attempts have been made to identify SPT and sIgE responses strong enough to avoid the need for a confirming oral food challenge.

== Prevention ==
Introducing eggs to a baby's diet is thought to affect the risk of developing allergy, but there are contradictory recommendations. A 2016 review acknowledged that introducing peanuts early appears to have a benefit, but stated, "The effect of early introduction of egg on egg allergy is controversial." A meta-analysis published the same year supported the theory that early introduction of eggs into an infant's diet lowers risk, and a review of allergens in general stated that introducing solid foods at 4–6 months may result in the lowest subsequent allergy risk. However, an older consensus document from the American College of Allergy, Asthma and Immunology recommended that introduction of chicken eggs be delayed to 24 months of age.

== Treatment ==
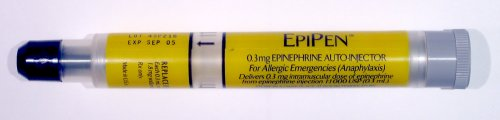
Epinephrine autoinjectors are portable single-dose epinephrine-dispensing devices used to treat anaphylaxis.

The mainstay of treatment is total avoidance of egg protein intake. This is complicated because the declaration of the presence of trace amounts of allergens in foods is not mandatory (see regulation of labelling).

Treatment for accidental ingestion of egg products by allergic individuals varies depending on the person's sensitivity. An antihistamine such as diphenhydramine (Benadryl) may be prescribed. Sometimes prednisone will be prescribed to prevent a possible late-phase Type I hypersensitivity reaction. Severe allergic reactions (anaphylaxis) may require treatment with an epinephrine pen, an injection device designed to be used by a non-healthcare professional when emergency treatment is warranted.

=== Immunotherapy ===
There is active research on trying oral immunotherapy (OIT) to desensitize people to egg allergens. A Cochrane Review concluded that OIT can desensitize people, but it remains unclear whether long-term tolerance develops after treatment ceases, and 69% of the people enrolled in the trials had adverse effects. They concluded there was a need for standardized protocols and guidelines before incorporating OIT into clinical practice. A second review noted that allergic reactions, up to anaphylaxis, can occur during OIT, and recommends that this treatment not be routine medical practice. A third review limited its scope to trials of baked egg-containing goods such as bread or cake as a means of resolving egg allergy. Again, there were some successes, but also some severe allergic reactions, and the authors came down on the side of not recommending this as treatment.

=== Avoiding eggs ===
Prevention of egg-allergic reactions means avoiding eggs and egg-containing foods. People with an allergy to chicken eggs may also be allergic to other types of eggs, such as goose, duck, or turkey eggs. In cooking, eggs are multifunctional: they may act as an emulsifier to reduce oil/water separation (mayonnaise), a binder (water binding and particle adhesion, as in meatloaf), or an aerator (cakes, especially angel food). Some commercial egg substitutes can substitute for particular functions (potato starch and tapioca for water binding, whey protein or bean water for aeration or particle binding, or soy lecithin or avocado for emulsification). Food companies produce egg-free mayonnaise and other replacement foods. Alfred Bird invented egg-free Bird's Custard, the original version of what is known generically as custard powder today.

Most people find it necessary to strictly avoid any item containing eggs, including:

- Albumin (egg white protein)
- Apovitellin (egg yolk protein)
- Egg Beaters (cholesterol-free, uses egg whites)
- Dried egg solids, powdered egg
- Egg, egg white, egg yolk
- Egg wash
- Eggnog
- Fat substitutes (some)
- Livetin (egg yolk protein)
- Lysozyme (egg white protein)
- Mayonnaise
- Meringue or meringue powder
- Ovalbumin (egg white protein)
- Ovoglobulin (egg white protein)
- Ovomucin (egg white protein)
- Ovomucoid (egg white protein)
- Ovotransferrin (egg white protein)
- Ovovitelia (egg yolk protein)
- Ovovitellin (egg yolk protein)
- Silici albuminate
- Simplesse
- Vitellin (egg yolk protein)

Ingredients that sometimes include egg protein include: artificial flavoring, natural flavoring, lecithin and nougat candy.

Probiotic products have been tested, and some have been found to contain milk and egg proteins, which were not always indicated on the labels.

== Prognosis ==
The majority of children outgrow egg allergy. One review reported that 70% of children will outgrow this allergy by age 16. In subsequently published longitudinal studies, one reported that for 140 infants who had challenge-confirmed egg allergy, 44% had resolved by two years. A second reported that for 203 infants with confirmed IgE-mediated egg allergy, 45% resolved by two years of age, 66% by four years, and 71% by six years. Children will be able to tolerate eggs as an ingredient in baked goods and well-cooked eggs sooner than under-cooked eggs. Resolution was more likely if baseline serum IgE was lower, and if the baseline symptoms did not include anaphylaxis.

== Epidemiology ==
In countries in North America and western Europe, where the use of cow's milk-based infant formula is common, chicken egg allergy is the second most common food allergy in infants and young children after cow's milk. However, in Japan, egg allergy is first and cow's milk second, followed by wheat and then the other common allergenic foods. A review from South Africa reported egg and peanut as the two most common allergenic foods.

Incidence and prevalence are terms commonly used in describing disease epidemiology. Incidence is the newly diagnosed cases, which can be expressed as new cases per year per million people. Prevalence is the number of cases alive, expressed as existing cases per million people during a time. Egg allergies are usually observed in infants and young children, and often disappear with age (see Prognosis), so the prevalence of egg allergy may be expressed as a percentage of children under a set age. One review estimates that in North American and western European populations the prevalence of egg allergy in children under the age of five years is 1.8-2.0%. A second described the range in young children as 0.5-2.5%. Although the majority of children develop tolerance as they age into school-age years, for roughly one-third, the allergy persists into adulthood. Strong predictors for adult-persistent allergy are anaphylactic symptoms as a child, high egg-specific serum IgE, robust response to the skin prick test, and absence of tolerance to egg-containing baked foods. Self-reported allergy prevalence is always higher than food-challenge confirmed allergy.

For all age groups, a review of fifty studies conducted in Europe estimated 2.5% for self-reported egg allergy and 0.2% for confirmed. National survey data in the United States collected in 2005 and 2006 showed that among those aged six and older, the prevalence of serum IgE confirmed egg allergy was under 0.2%.

Adult-onset of egg allergy is rare, but confirmed cases have occurred. Some were described as having started in late teenage years; another group were workers in the baking industry who were exposed to powdered egg dust.

== Regulation ==
Whether food allergy prevalence is increasing or not, food allergy awareness has increased, with impacts on the quality of life for children, their parents, and their immediate caregivers. In the United States, the Food Allergen Labeling and Consumer Protection Act of 2004 (FALCPA) causes people to be reminded of allergy problems every time they handle a food package, and restaurants have added allergen warnings to menus. The Culinary Institute of America, a premier school for chef training, has courses in allergen-free cooking and a separate teaching kitchen. School systems have protocols about what foods can be brought into the school. Despite all these precautions, people with serious allergies are aware that accidental exposure can easily occur at other people's houses, at school, or in restaurants.

=== Regulation of labelling ===
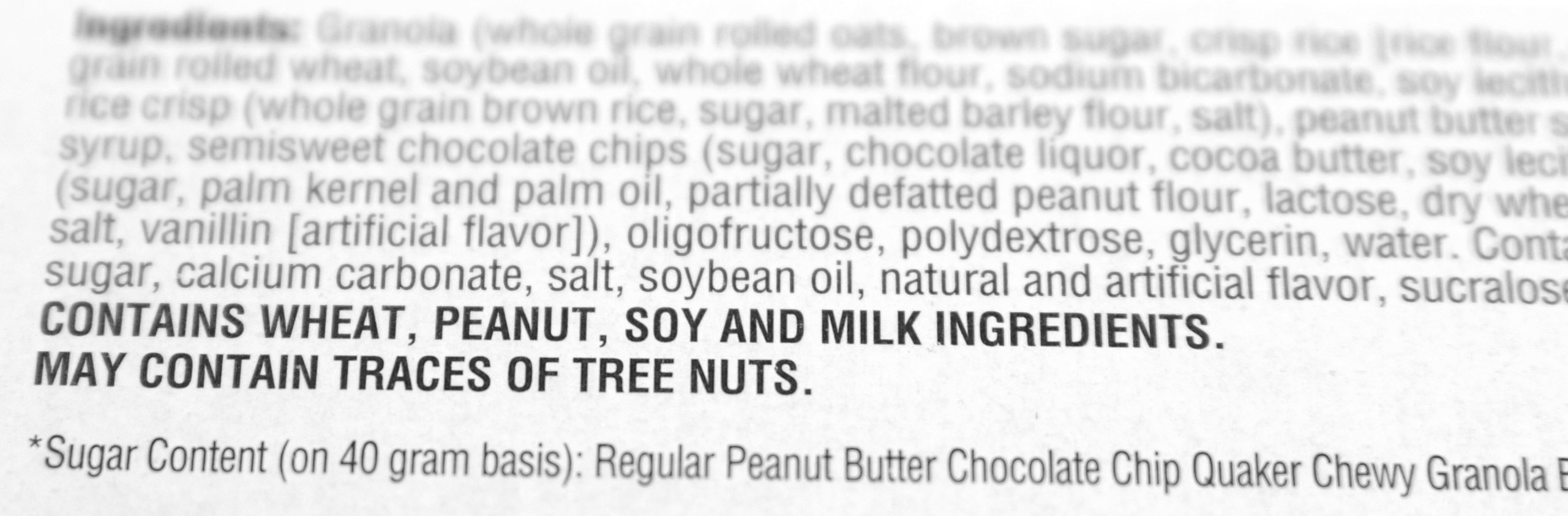
An example of "MAY CONTAIN TRACES OF..." as a means of listing trace amounts of allergens in a food product due to cross-contamination during manufacture

In response to the risk that certain foods pose to those with food allergies, some countries have responded by instituting labeling laws that require food products to inform consumers if their products contain major allergens or byproducts of major allergens among the ingredients intentionally added to foods. Nevertheless, there are no labeling laws to mandatorily declare the presence of trace amounts in the final product as a consequence of cross-contamination, except in Brazil.

==== Ingredients intentionally added ====
FALCPA became effective 1 January 2006, requiring companies selling foods in the United States to disclose on labels whether a packaged food product contains any of these eight major food allergens, added intentionally: cow's milk, peanuts, eggs, shellfish, fish, tree nuts, soy and wheat. This list originated in 1999 from the World Health Organisation Codex Alimentarius Commission. To meet FALCPA labeling requirements, if an ingredient is derived from one of the required-label allergens, then it must either have its "food sourced name" in parentheses, for example "Casein (milk)," or as an alternative, there must be a statement separate but adjacent to the ingredients list: "Contains milk" (and any other of the allergens with mandatory labeling).

In 2025, the FDA issued guidance on FALCPA expanding labeling requirements to eggs from ducks, geese, quail, and other birds, in addition to eggs from chicken. For birds other than chicken, ingredient labels must include the name of the bird source ("duck egg," for example).

FALCPA applies to packaged foods regulated by the FDA, which does not include poultry, most meats, certain egg products, and most alcoholic beverages. However, some meat, poultry, and egg processed products may contain allergenic ingredients. These products are regulated by the Food Safety and Inspection Service (FSIS), which requires that any ingredient be declared in the labeling only by its common or usual name. Neither the identification of the source of a specific ingredient in a parenthetical statement nor the use of statements to alert for the presence of specific ingredients, like "Contains: milk", are mandatory according to FSIS. FALCPA also does not apply to food prepared in restaurants. The EU Food Information for Consumers Regulation 1169/2011 – requires food businesses to provide allergy information on food sold unpackaged, for example, in catering outlets, deli counters, bakeries and sandwich bars.

==== Trace amounts as a result of cross-contamination ====
The value of allergen labeling other than for intentional ingredients is controversial. This concerns labeling for ingredients present unintentionally as a consequence of cross-contact or cross-contamination at any point along the food chain (during raw material transportation, storage or handling, due to shared equipment for processing and packaging, etc.). Experts in this field propose that if allergen labeling is to be useful to consumers, and healthcare professionals who advise and treat those consumers, ideally there should be agreement on which foods require labeling, threshold quantities below which labeling may be of no purpose, and validation of allergen detection methods to test and potentially recall foods that were deliberately or inadvertently contaminated.

Labeling regulations have been modified to provide for mandatory labeling of ingredients plus voluntary labeling, termed precautionary allergen labeling (PAL), also known as "may contain" statements, for possible, inadvertent, trace amount, cross-contamination during production. PAL labeling can be confusing to consumers, especially as there can be many variations on the wording of the warning. As of 2014 PAL is regulated only in Switzerland, Japan, Argentina, and South Africa. Argentina decided to prohibit precautionary allergen labeling since 2010, and instead puts the onus on the manufacturer to control the manufacturing process and label only those allergenic ingredients known to be in the products. South Africa does not permit the use of PAL, except when manufacturers demonstrate the potential presence of allergen due to cross-contamination through a documented risk assessment and despite adherence to Good Manufacturing Practice. In Australia and New Zealand there is a recommendation that PAL be replaced by guidance from VITAL 2.0 (Vital Incidental Trace Allergen Labeling). A review identified "the eliciting dose for an allergic reaction in 1% of the population" as ED01. This threshold reference dose for foods such as cow's milk, egg, peanut and other proteins) will provide food manufacturers with guidance for developing precautionary labeling and give consumers a better idea of might be accidentally in a food product beyond "may contain." VITAL 2.0 was developed by the Allergen Bureau, a food industry-sponsored, non-government organization. The European Union has initiated a process to create labeling regulations for unintentional contamination, but is not expected to publish such before 2024.

In Brazil, since April 2016, the declaration of the possibility of cross-contamination is mandatory when the product does not intentionally add any allergenic food or its derivatives, but the Good Manufacturing Practices and allergen control measures adopted are not sufficient to prevent the presence of accidental trace amounts. These allergens include wheat, rye, barley, oats and their hybrids, crustaceans, eggs, fish, peanuts, soybean, milk of all species of mammalians, almonds, hazelnuts, cashew nuts, Brazil nuts, macadamia nuts, walnuts, pecan nuts, pistaches, pine nuts, and chestnuts.

== Society and culture ==
Food fear has a significant impact on the quality of life. For children with allergies, their quality of life is also affected by the actions of their peers. There is an increased occurrence of bullying, which can include threats or acts of deliberately being touched with foods they need to avoid, also having their allergen-free food deliberately contaminated.

== See also ==
- List of allergens (food and non-food)
