= Vitellin =

In biochemistry, vitellin is a generic name for major of many phosphoproteins found in egg yolk.

Vitellin has been known since the 1900s. The periodic acid-Schiff method and Sudan black B dye was used to help determine that Vitellin is a glycolipoprotein because it stained positive when tested. This protein was found to weigh ~540 kDa, given the weight of each of its 4 major subunits.

Vitellin is essential in the fertilization process, and embryonic development in egg-laying organisms.

This phosphoprotein acts as a membrane, 1-3.5μm, that encloses the egg that comprises at least five glycoproteins that resemble the zona pellucida evident in mammalian organisms. When the egg is fertilized, it buds off from the gamete surface, which results in the fertilization of the membrane in most invertebrates, amphibians, birds, and fishes. During fertilization, the acrosome of the sperm interacts with the vitelline envelope that has species-specific recognition and binding for the sperm. The vitelline membrane consists of two major layers found below the ovary and the outer layer found in the oviduct. This membrane supports the yolk and separates from the albumen, or egg white. The proteins that primarily compose the vitelline membrane are the lysozyme and ovomucin foundational for membrane growth during embryonic development. Aside from structural functions, it is also a barrier that permits the diffusion of water and nutrients, and in chickens especially, it is a barrier against microbial infection. Vitellin comprises a vast fraction of the proteins found in eggs, and due to this, they are easily characterized with biochemical methods in order to elucidate molecular, developments, and physiological regulation studies.

Vitellin was studied in honey bees and was found that it contributed to the health of the embryo in the form of immunity in the embryonic stages. This immunity came from two of the four domains of this protein structure. The honey bees, the domain of unknown function 1943 (DUF1943), and the von Willebrand factor (vWF) type D domain were linked to pathogen recognition and increased immunity in the embryonic honey bees.

== Allergen ==
Vitellin is an umbrella term for many vitellin sub proteins and some of these sub proteins are linked with egg allergies.

== See also ==
- Egg allergy
- Vitellogenin
