= Chickpea protein =

Chickpea protein is obtained from chickpeas (Cicer arietinum) using different extraction processes based either on the isoelectric pH point, air classification, or on enzymatic treatment and separation.

Chickpeas in their natural state contain 16–24% protein as well as starch, dietary fiber, iron, calcium and additional minerals.

The concentration of protein varies among chickpea protein products.

== Uses ==
The product can act as a substitute for animal-based protein such as egg protein, dairy protein, meat. It is gluten-free and is not a listed allergen. The protein acts as an emulsifier that combines water and fat contributing to the creation of a stable viscous mass. It can be used as a raw material in, hot or cold applications.

== Products ==
Example of products which can be based on chickpea protein include dairy-free yoghurt, plant-based beverages, high-protein energy bars, savory snacks, pastry, egg-free mayonnaise, meat substitutes, and others.

== Nutritional value ==
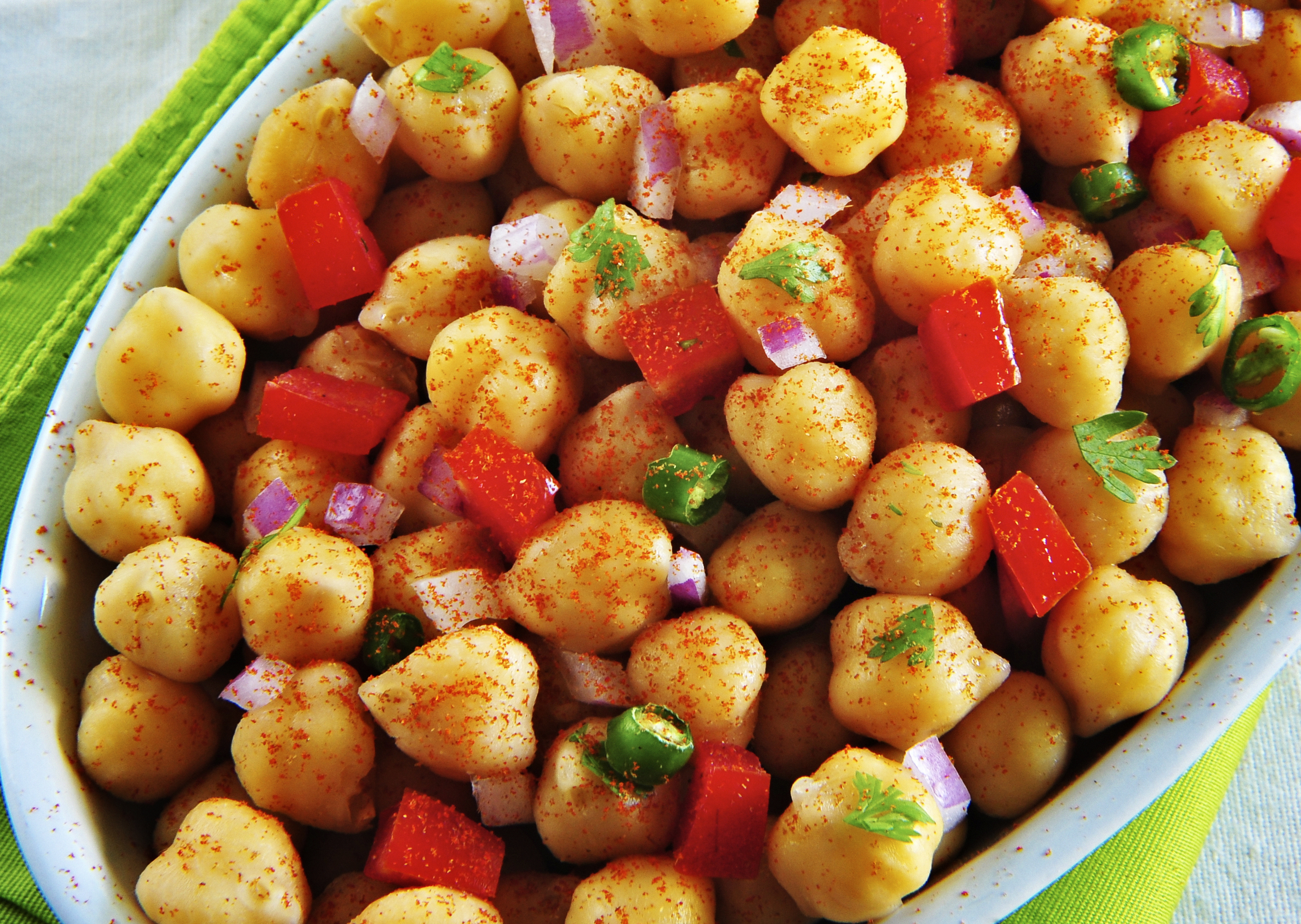
Chickpeas contain essential amino acids.

Chickpea protein has several nutritional benefits:

- It contains a substantial amount of essential amino acids.
- It is rich in non-saturated fatty acids, such as linoleic and oleic acids.
- It can be used as an egg substitute in cooking; for example, Aquafaba.
