= Ovotransferrin =

Protein found in egg whites

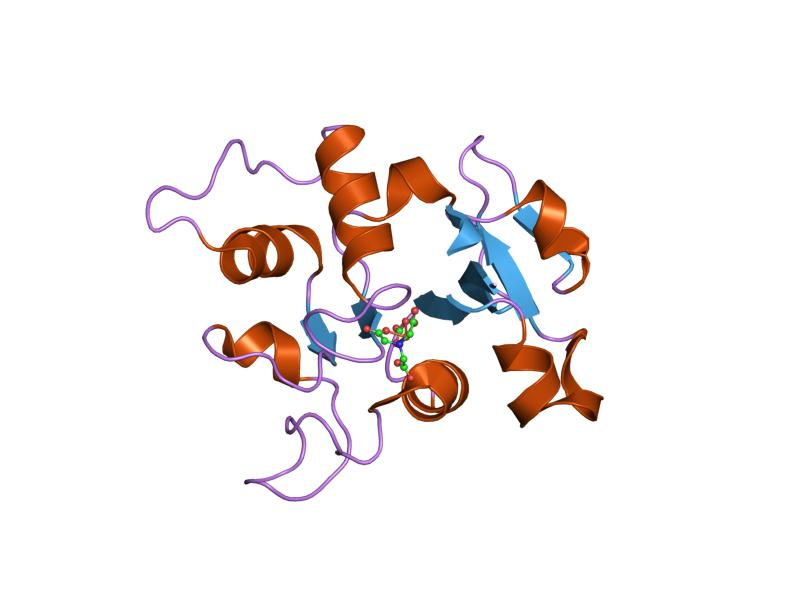
- PDB 1gvc EBI

Identifiers
- Organism: Gallus gallus
- Symbol: TF
- Orthologs: OMA: entry
- UniProt: P02789
Search for
- Structures: Swiss-model
- Domains: InterPro

Ovotransferrin (conalbumin) is a glycoprotein of egg white albumen. Egg white albumen is composed of multiple proteins, of which ovotransferrin is the most heat reliable. It has a molecular weight of 76,000 daltons and contains about 700 amino acids. Ovotransferrin makes up approximately 13% of egg albumen (in contrast to ovalbumin, which comprises 54%). As a member of the transferrin and metalloproteinase family, ovotransferrin has been found to possess antibacterial and antioxidant and immunomodulatory properties, arising primarily through its iron (Fe3+) binding capacity by locking away a key biochemical component necessary for micro-organismal survival. Bacteria starved of iron are rendered incapable of moving, making ovotransferrin a potent bacteriostatic.

== Structure ==
Ovotransferrin is folded in a way that forms two lobes (N- and C- terminals) and each lobe consists of a binding site. Each lobe is then divided into two domains of 160 amino acid residues. Its structure also consists of fifteen disulfide crosslinks and no free sulfhydryl groups. Disulfide groups stabilize the tertiary structures of proteins. Transferrins are iron binding proteins and acute phase reactants of animal serum. It has a binding log of 15 at a pH of 7 or above, meaning that the iron binding capacity of ovotransferrin rapidly decreased at a pH that is less than 6. This family is also known for their role in cell maturation by transporting essential nutrients to developing embryos. Ovotransferrin functions as an antimicrobial agent and transports iron to the developing embryo. Because they bind to iron, this makes it difficult for harmful bacteria to be nutritionally satisfied with them so it acts as an antimicrobial.

The primary sequence of ovotransferrin is similar to that of many serum transferrins found in other species. Ovotransferrin has a single N-linked glycosylation site as asparagine 492. While ovotransferrin identifies with its family, there are two types of ovotransferrin proteins: apo and holo. Apo-Ovotransferrin is deprived of iron and holo-Ovotransferrin is saturated with iron. Because the apo-ovotransferrin is iron-deprived, it is easily destroyed by physical and chemical treatments.

== Function and mechanism ==
Biologically, conalbumin isolates and sequesters metallic contaminants in the egg white. Ovotransferrin is functionally and structurally analogous to mammalian lactoferrin. A recent study has shown superior performance of ovotransferrin when compared to lactoferrin in its capability to deliver iron without accumulation or inducing gastric irritability, rendering ovotransferrin as an excellent potential iron carrier for the treatment of Iron-deficiency anemia (IDA). Ovotransferrin showed superior physiological iron delivery over lactoferrin in a gastric barrier model. This data holds much promise for ovotransferrin's use in food supplements, with dual functionality as both antimicrobial and iron delivery mechanism.

== Role in disease and therapy ==
Numerous studies have identified dual anti-osteoporotic properties of ovotransferrin, both reducing bone resorption and promoting bone formation. Beyond this, ovotransferrin shows promise as a drug carrier with potential applications in cancer treatment. Indeed, ovotransferrin alone is toxic to cancer cells in-vitro. Its antioxidant and anti-inflammatory properties may also make ovotransferrin a viable treatment for cardiovascular disease.

== See also ==
- Egg allergy
