= Histamine liberators =

Type of organic compounds

Histamine is an organic compound that primarily functions in service of the human body's immune responses as well as for the regulation of many physiological functions. Since their discovery in 1910, histamines have been known to trigger inflammatory responses such as itching as part of an immune response to foreign pathogens; for example, mosquito bites or allergens. It is released in granular form by mast cells, a type of white blood cell in connective tissues close to the site of interaction. Upon releasing, it increases the permeability of the blood capillaries for white blood cells and other proteins to enter in order to eliminate the foreign pathogens. The highest concentrations in mammalian tissue occur in the skin, intestines and lungs, sites where most symptoms of allergic responses are felt.

Histamine liberators are substances that contain low amounts of histamine themselves but are capable of releasing histamine from the mast cells. The existence of these liberators were introduced by theories propounded during the 1950s-1970s after the use of certain anaesthetics were shown to cause flushing and discoloration of the upper limbs of rodents in vitro (within cells and tissues extracted from a living organism). This immune response was accompanied by an increase in plasma histamine levels, thus, specific compounds in different anaesthetics were extracted and identified as ‘histamine liberators’ after experimental study.

However, the validity in their mechanism of even being able to degranulate the histamine from the mast cells for its release have been questioned in recent research. Nonetheless, the suggestion of its existence is still important as those with histamine intolerance are highly sensitive to its release due to inadequate breakdown, resulting in excess accumulation. Its profusion increases the risk for bronchiole constriction of the lungs or the hepatic veins, leading to anaphylactic shock and death if left untreated.

Furthermore, such postulations has instigated research into foods that could potentially be histamine liberators, such as egg whites, peanuts, and shellfish; allergic reactions upon the consumption of said foods are ubiquitous and widespread.

== Proposed mechanisms of histamine liberators ==
=== MRGPRX2 receptor activation ===
Binding to the Mas-related G protein–coupled receptor-X2 (MRGPRX2) in cutaneous mast cell is the only proven mechanism of direct mast cell degranulation that corresponds to proposed histamine liberators action. So far, few substances, such as drugs dextromethorphan, morphine, and related opioid ligands have been shown to serve as ligands for the MRGPRX2.

=== The protease theory ===
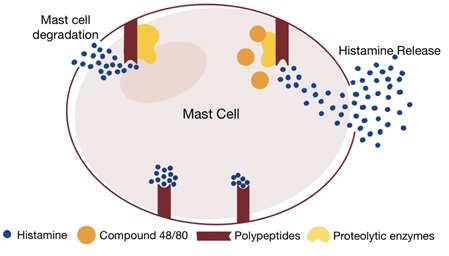
The mechanism of the protease theory

When research on histamine liberators peaked during the 1950s, the ‘Protease theory’, proposed during 1962 by Börje Uvnäs, was one of the most prominent explanations attempting to explain the mechanisms of histamine liberators. Experimental studies were conducted to elucidate the mechanism of histamine liberators found in anaesthetics; for instance, one particular experiment demonstrated that proteolytic enzymes (a type of enzyme that digests proteins such as pepsin and trypsin) were able to split histamine compounds from the polypeptides (proteins within the mast cell) to which they were bound to. The activity of these proteolytic enzymes were also seen to increase in the presence of compound 48/80 (along with other histamine liberator compounds). Thus, it was hypothesized that when these enzymes were activated, they liberated and freed histamine molecules by degrading the mast cell, triggering a response in the surrounding tissue.

However, the exact, precise mechanism as to how the proteolytic enzymes split the polypeptides remains convoluted. Despite this, the main argument compounding this theory is the activity of another set of enzymes (known as kinases) splits groups of pro-activators to yield activators. This engenders a downstream effect: activators activate proteolytic enzymes, causing an attack on the attachment between histamine molecules and mast cell polypeptides is triggered. The ultimate effect is that histamine is released.

Nonetheless, the protease theory did contain flaws undermining its validity. Firstly, biochemical literature has shown that trypsin has a weak ability to liberate histamine, being only effective when present at high concentrations. Fibrolysin is simply unable to release histamine at all per se. Moreover, a quantitative relationship between protease concentration and the amount of histamine released has not been found. A lack of even a meagre, weak positive correlation means that this theory cannot stand to point to histamine liberators as the causation of histamine release, or in fact, the mere existence of histamine liberators at all. Furthermore, despite there being evidence suggesting that histamine is bonded to polypeptides (most likely through covalent bonding), concrete evidence directly proving this fact has not been found yet.

=== The displacement theory ===
A second theory put forward was the ‘displacement theory’, that suggested histamine's chemical makeup to be the basis of its own liberation. Histamine is a weak base (a compound able to react with a hydrogen ion to form an acid) that can link with acid groups within the granules of the mast cells.

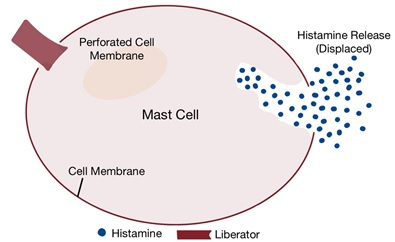
The mechanism of the displacement theory

The crux of this theory lies in the assumption that histamine liberators release histamine by displacing it from cells. The mechanism hypothesised by which histamine is displaced occurs in two steps: firstly, the liberator penetrate the membranes of mast cells, compromising the integrity of its membrane. Secondly, now that the cell membrane is pierced, the liberator enters the cell. Since there is no air or free space, this forces the histamine already existing in the mast cell to be displaced outside the cell, thereby releasing and “liberating” it. Some histamine liberators were thought to be organic bases as they are synonymous with histamine since it is a base as well, thus facilitating its displacement.

Experimental evidence supporting this theory has shown that organic bases and compound 48/80, when administered in tandem, triggered a release of histamine in guinea pigs. Such results were replicable both in vivo (within an entire living organism) and in vitro. Nevertheless, experiments actually showed a smaller amount of compound 48/80 could “displace” a much larger amount of histamine. For instance, an experiment performed on a cat paw demonstrated that 10 micrograms of 48/80 released 7 times more, 75 micrograms to be exact, of histamine. This seems to undermine the validity of the theory as it does not make logical sense for a small amount of compound to displace a much a larger amount of histamine. Additionally, the degree of mast cell membrane permeability was also fragmentary and its disruption may not even be sufficient to cause the intracellular histamine to be released.

=== The enzymatic theory ===
It has also been postulated that enzymatic theories underpin the mechanism of histamine liberators. In an experiment conducted in the early 1950s, a team of scientists procured active histamine-liberating chemicals from jellyfish and swine. They attempted to acquire experimental evidence supporting the hypothesis that compound 48/80 ruptures mast cells, thereby acting as histamine liberator through an enzymatic mechanism.

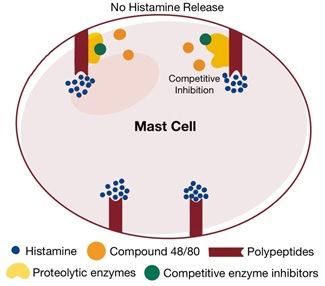
The mechanism of the enzymatic theory

It was also found that specific ions such as Zn^{2+}, as well as enzyme inhibitors such as phenylhydrazine, were effective at substantially reducing or completely stopping the action of histamine liberators – most notably the aforementioned compound 48/80. This constituted as evidence suggesting that such compounds acted like competitive inhibitors, a mechanism that inhibits the activity of enzymes needed for histamine release. Moreover, the action and potency of compound 48/80 was found to be temperature dependent: it only functioned effectively as a histamine liberator at optimal temperatures and was rendered ineffective at extreme temperatures. These specificities provided more evidence supporting the claim that histamine liberators (such as compound 48/80) acted through enzymatic mechanisms as these characteristics are synonymous with existing enzymes.

The action of compound 48/80 varies with pH – another distinctive characteristic that enzymes also exhibit. Experimental data revealed that at a pH of 7.8, the amount of histamine released peaks. pH values deviating above or below 7.8 show less histamine being released; yet, at a pH higher than 9.2, the amount of histamine released again increases. This was hypothesised to be caused by changes in acidity of the internal environment of the mast cells. However, other histamine-liberating substances, such as decylamine, manifested a steady increase in histamine activity with rising pH.

During the 1960s, this enzymatic theory was deemed to the most plausible mechanism and garnered the most support and approval from scientists; however, there were still some uncertainties associated with it. Just because histamine liberators share common characteristics with enzymes does not necessarily prove that they act as enzymes. However, during the 1960s to the 1970s, much of the different disciplines of biochemistry was still at its infancy. Modern analytical techniques involving nuclear magnetic resonance (NMR) or X-ray crystallography, which is needed to determine the 3-dimensional structures of proteins and enzymes, had not been discovered yet during that time. It is now known that such technology is crucial for determining the exact mechanism of enzymes.

== Significance ==
When the theory of histamine liberators was at the forefront of medical research back in the 1950s, the findings of such research was of particular relevance for individuals prone to food allergies. During that time, many dietitians advised that a diet devoid of histamine-liberating foods was the ideal strategy to prevent symptoms of histamine intolerance from manifesting. Lists of foods deemed to be histamine-liberating were published in various scientific articles, which included fermented sausages, cured cheese, wine and beer.

On a molecular level, there were scientists who sought to find more precise lists of chemicals which could have histamine-liberating potencies. For instance, in a scientific journal, MacIntosh and Paton publicized a list of various compounds thought to be histamine liberators, such as organic bases, amines and guanidines. Many of such occurred naturally in organisms such as sea anemones, jellyfish and caterpillars. This proved to be of great use to dietitians; they could confirm whether a certain food was histamine-liberating or not through checking if its chemical constituents were included in the aforementioned list of chemicals.

== Recent research and studies ==
Notwithstanding the fact that the theory of histamine liberators dates back to the 1950s, there have been contemporary attempts to re-evaluate the validity and significance of the histamine liberator theory.

Scientists attempted to elucidate the theory of Histamine Liberators back in the 1950s to the early 1970s. However, despite many years of research, it was held that there was insufficient evidence conclusively supporting the theory and mechanism of histamine liberators. Thus, further scientific research on this topic ceased towards the end of the 1970s. Nonetheless, in 2005, a group of scientists in the Netherlands sought to peruse over and re-evaluate the dated scientific literature on histamine liberators. Many of such scientific articles recurrently purported that histamine-releasing foods exacerbated symptoms of mastocytosis (a build-up of mast cells in specific bodily areas) There was a belief that histamine-releasing foods could induce allergy-like symptoms. However, upon carefully considering the validity of the scientific methods, it was held that the validity of the original mechanism is somewhat questionable and perhaps needs more evidence to support it. Notwithstanding, the scientists noted that this is a very interesting area with lots of potential, due to its important implications for anaesthesia usage and those with food allergies.
