= Egg substitutes =

Food products which can be used to replace eggs in cooking and baking

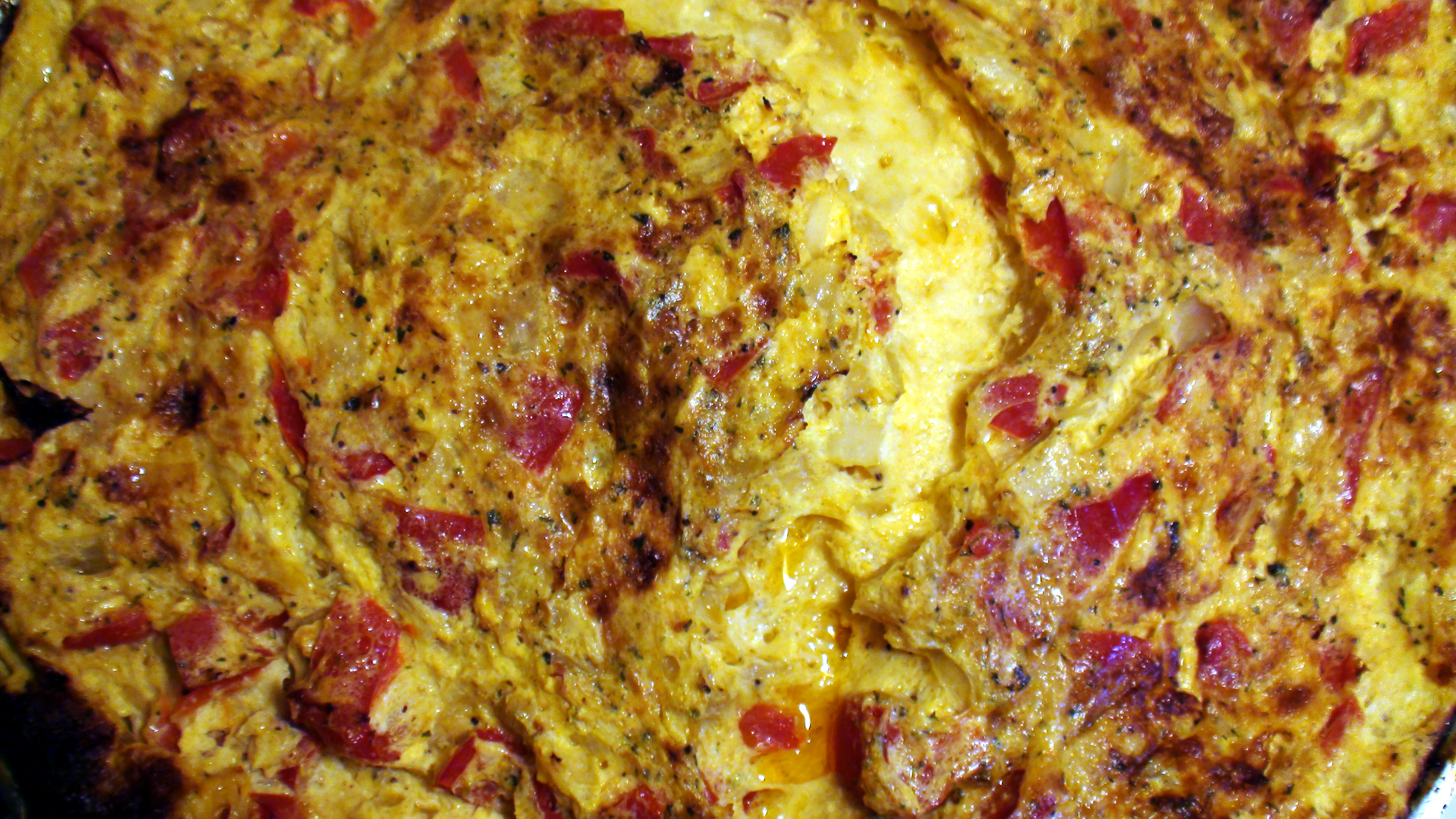
Close-up view of an omelette prepared with an egg substitute

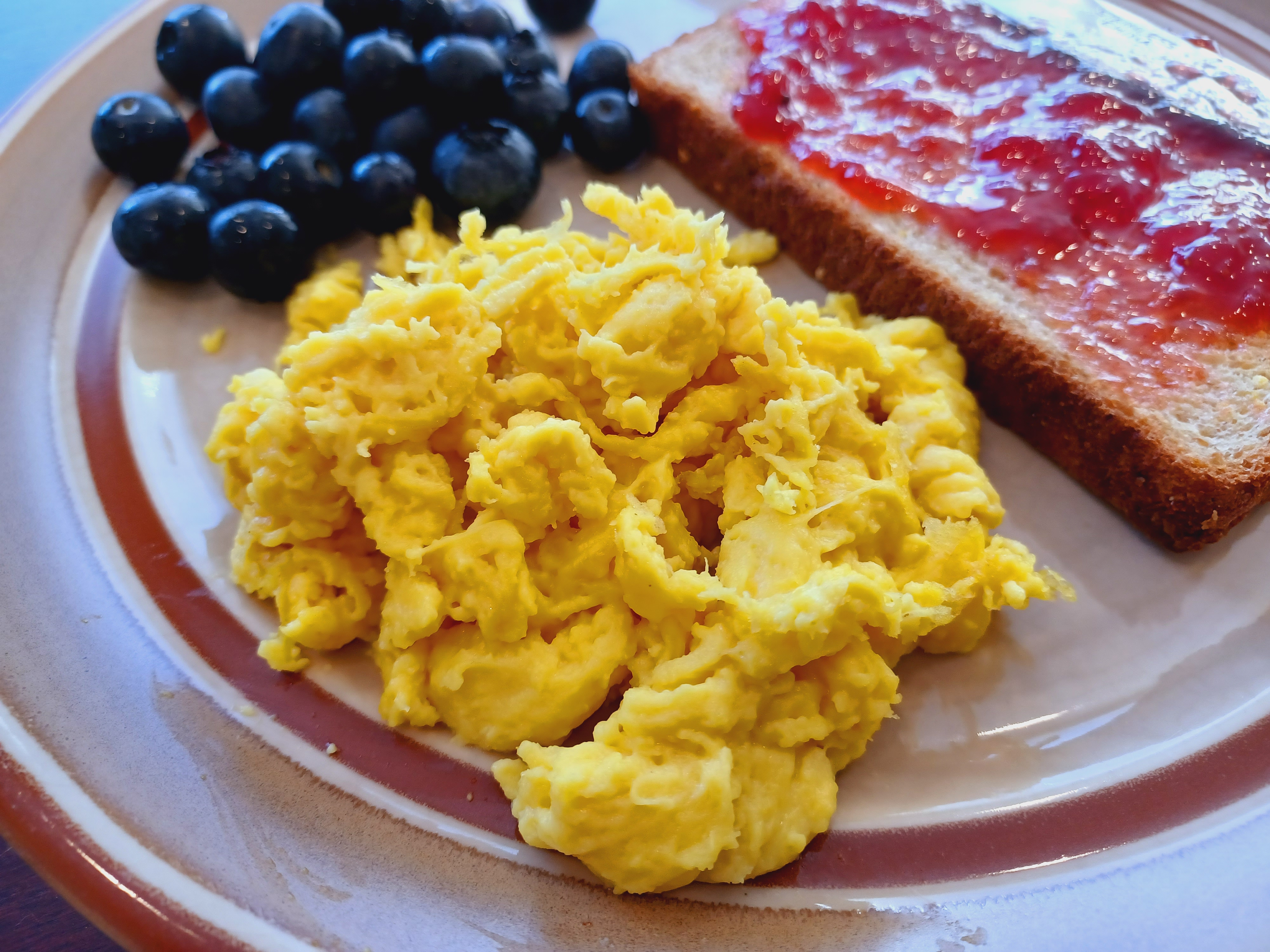
Just Egg brand egg substitute, cooked like scrambled eggs

Egg substitutes are food products which can be used to replace eggs in cooking and baking. Common reasons a cook may choose to use an egg substitute instead of egg(s) include having an egg allergy, adhering to a vegan diet or a vegetarian diet of a type that omits eggs, having concerns about the level of animal welfare or environmental burden associated with egg farming, or worries about potential Salmonella contamination when using raw eggs. There is a growing movement to address some of these concerns via third-party certifications, but because many labels in the industry remain confusing or intentionally misleading, some consumers distrust them and may use egg substitutes instead.

== Types ==
=== Commercial ===
There are many commercial substitutes on the market today for people who wish to avoid eggs. Most of these products are devoid of all animal products, and thus are vegan and contain no cholesterol.

- The EVERY Company, a venture-backed company, produces bioidentical egg whites through a fermentation process.
- JUST, Inc., another venture-backed company, produces and markets egg-free products, including cookie dough and a mayonnaise substitute, based on pea protein from the yellow pea.
- Egg Replacer is a mixture of "potato starch, tapioca flour, leavening (calcium lactate, calcium carbonate, cream of tartar), cellulose gum, modified cellulose".
- The Vegg is a vegan liquid egg yolk replacer, suitable in any recipe that one would alternatively use egg yolk. It is made of "nutritional yeast flakes, sodium alginate, kala namak, [and] beta-carotene".
- FUMI Ingredients produces egg white substitutes from micro-algae with the help of micro-organisms such as brewer's yeast and baker's yeast.

The product called Egg Beaters is a substitute for whole/fresh eggs (from the shell) but is not an egg substitute; it consists mainly of egg whites.

=== Homemade ===
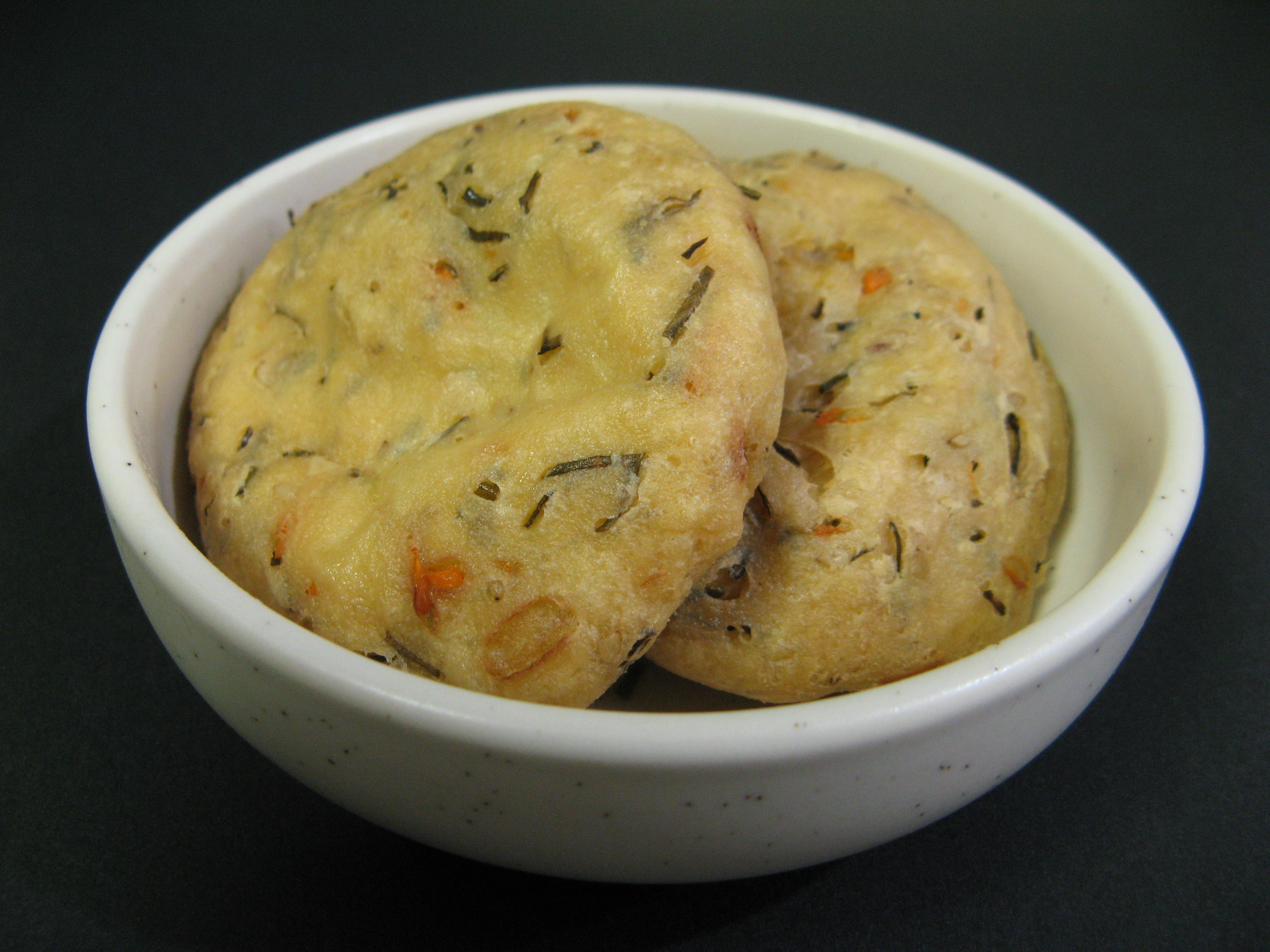
Tofu may be used for creating egg-like dishes.

Simple homemade egg substitutes can be made using many different ingredients, depending on which aspect(s) of an egg must be replicated. Some commonly used substitutes are tofu, various fruit purées, potato starch, mashed potato, baking powder, ground seeds (especially flax and chia), chickpea flour, and plant milk.

- Aquafaba refers to the drained water and solutes that remain after cooking chickpeas. It can also be obtained by saving the water solution from a commercial can of chickpeas. As it can replicate the whipped structural loft as well as the moisture of egg whites, it enables egg-avoiding cooks to produce such elusive egg dishes as macarons, lemon meringue pie, or homemade mayonnaise.
- Tofu can be used as an egg substitute in recipes that use many eggs, like quiches or custards. Tofu doesn't fluff up like eggs or aquafaba, but it does reproduce the meaty structure and texture that is needed for some "eggy" dishes. For more fluffy egg dishes such as an omelette, silken tofu may be used.
- In sweet, baked foods and desserts, many different fruits can be used to serve the same purpose as eggs. These act by replacing the moisture and structural "binding" for which recipes often call for eggs. However, these will also add some flavor to the recipe. To replace one egg, the following fruits can be substituted:
  - 1/4 cup (~60 mL) banana
  - 1/4 cup (~60 mL) canned pumpkin or squash
  - 1/4 cup (~60 mL) applesauce
  - 1/4 cup (~60 mL) puréed prunes

One large egg (the size almost every recipe uses) equals 1/4 cup (~60 mL) when whisked.

- Ground chia seeds can also be used to thicken dishes or as a binding agent. If it is important to maintain the colour of the recipe, use white chia seeds rather than the dark ones, which would darken the final product.
- Sometimes eggs are also used solely to provide moisture, in which case they can be substituted with 1/4 cup (~60 mL) of water, milk, plant milk, fruit juice or fruit puree per egg.
- Chickpea flour can be used in many recipes to provide both the texture and colour that eggs would otherwise provide, as well as nutritional benefits including protein, folate, iron, calcium, and many other vitamins and minerals. 1/4 cup (~60 mL) chickpea flour combined with 1/4 cup (~60 mL) water or other liquid is equivalent to one egg. Veganbaking.net notes that the only drawback to chickpea flour is that it tastes terrible prior to cooking, so if unbaked batter will be eaten, it is advisable to use a different option, like flax or chia seeds, which does not alter the taste of the recipe.

== See also ==
- Egg Beaters
