= Ovalbumin =

Main protein found in egg white

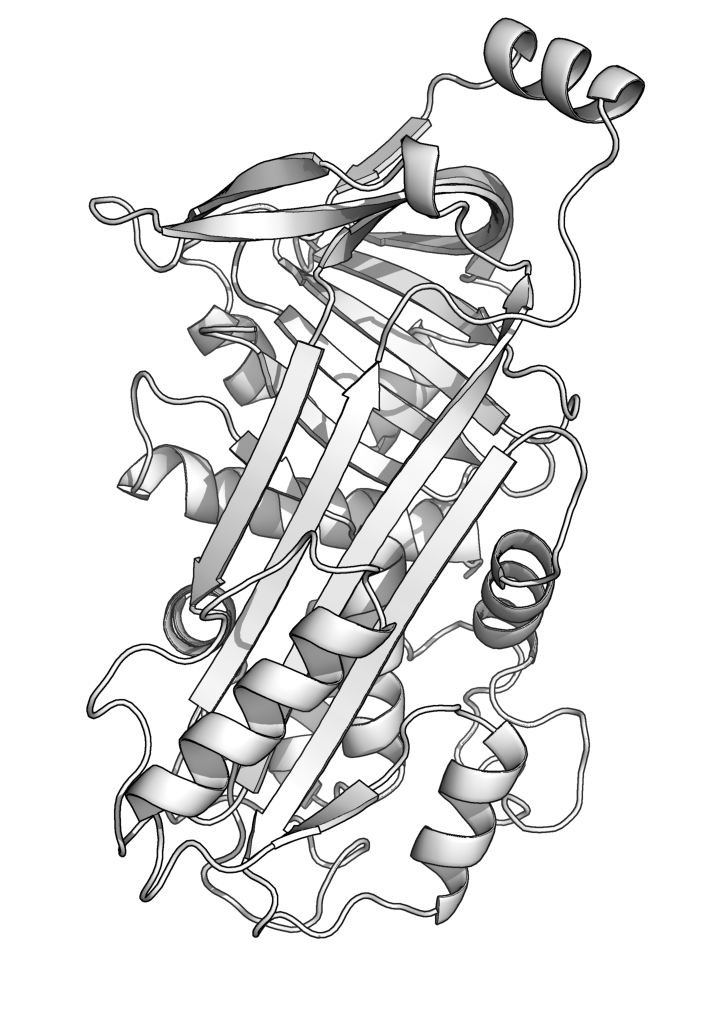
- Structure of ovalbumin (PDB: 1OVA)

Identifiers
- Organism: Gallus gallus
- Symbol: ?
- UniProt: P01012
Search for
- Structures: Swiss-model
- Domains: InterPro

Ovalbumin (abbreviated OVA) is the main protein found in egg white, making up approximately 55% of the total protein. Ovalbumin displays sequence and three-dimensional homology to the serpin superfamily, but unlike most serpins it is not a serine protease inhibitor. The function of ovalbumin is unknown, although it is presumed to be a storage protein.

== Research ==
Ovalbumin is an important protein in several different areas of research, including:

- general studies of protein structure and properties (because it is available in large quantities).
- studies of serpin structure and function (the fact that ovalbumin does not inhibit proteases means that by comparing its structure with that of inhibitory serpins, the structural characteristics required for inhibition can be determined).
- proteomics (chicken egg ovalbumin is commonly used as a molecular weight marker for calibrating electrophoresis gels).
- immunology (commonly used to stimulate an allergic reaction in test subjects; e.g., established model allergen for airway hyper-responsiveness, AHR).

(For in vivo and in vitro studies based on ovalbumin it is important that the endotoxin content is less than 1 EU/mg.)

== Structure ==
The ovalbumin protein of chickens consists of 385 amino acids, its relative molecular mass is 42.7 kDa, and it adopts a serpin-like structure. Ovalbumin also has several modifications, including N-terminal acetylation (G1), phosphorylation (S68, S344), and glycosylation (N292). It has three isoforms, A1, A2, and A3, which vary based on the number of bound phosphate residues. It is secreted from the cell, targeted by an internal signal sequence (residues 21–47), rather than the N-terminal signal sequence commonly found in other secreted proteins. Ovalbumin's signal sequence is not cleaved off, but remains as part of the mature protein.

=== Change upon heating ===
When heated, ovalbumin undergoes a conformational change from its soluble, serpin structure into an insoluble all-β-sheet structure with exposed hydrophobic regions. This causes the protein to aggregate and cause the solidification associated with cooked egg white.

== See also ==
- Egg allergy
