= Compound 48/80 =

Names
- IUPAC name Poly({2-methoxy-5-[2-(methylamino)ethyl]-1,3-phenylene}methylene)

Identifiers
RTECS number	Gk2402500
UN number	2811

Properties
Chemical formula	(C_{11}H_{15}NO)_{n}
Molar mass	Variable
Solubility in water	50 mg/mL

Hazards
- GHS labelling
Hazard statements	H301, H311, H331
Precautionary statements	P233, P261, P280, P301, P302, P304, P310, P312, P330, P340, P352, P403
- Except where otherwise noted, data are given for materials in their standard state (at 25 °C [77 °F], 100 kPa). Infobox references

Compound 48/80 is a polymer produced by the condensation of N-methyl-p-methoxyphenethylamine with formaldehyde. It promotes histamine release, and in biochemical research, compound 48/80 is used to promote mast cell degranulation.
