= Egg Beaters =

Brand of packaged egg whites

- Product type: Liquid eggs and egg whites
- Current owner: Post Holdings
- Introduced: 1972; 54 years ago
- Website: www.eggbeaters.com

Egg Beaters is a product marketed in the United States as a healthy substitute for whole eggs. It is a substitute for whole/fresh eggs (from the shell) that contains less cholesterol, but it is not an egg substitute (in the sense of a food to replace eggs for people with egg allergies). Egg Beaters is primarily egg whites with added flavorings, vitamins, and thickeners xanthan gum and guar gum. It contains real egg whites, but no egg yolks.

== Past and present ==
The Egg Beaters product was introduced in 1972 at a time when there was a widespread public perception in various countries that any dietary cholesterol was detrimental to cardiovascular health. Because egg yolks have plenty of cholesterol, this notion created a market demand for a way to eat eggs or egg-like foods without ingesting dietary cholesterol. The Egg Beaters product served this demand with egg whites that were convenient (required no eggshell handling and no yolk separating by the user) and yet still had the pleasing yellowness and texture of regular beaten (whole) eggs. The product was originally sold frozen as "Fleischmann's Egg Beaters". Advertisements at the time stated: "Fleischmann's has substituted yolk-like ingredients for the cholesterol packed yolk of a fresh egg." A 16-US-fluid-ounce (470 ml) package cost 79 cents in 1973 (equivalent to $6 in 2025). The refrigerated version was introduced in 1994. For a brief time, the company sold Egg Beaters With Yolk, which contained a small amount of yolk.

The product was originally introduced by Standard Brands, which merged with Nabisco in 1981 to form Nabisco Brands, Inc. ConAgra acquired Nabisco's refrigerated food business in late 1998. Conagra sold Egg Beaters to Post Holdings Inc in May 2021.

Egg Beaters are sometimes included as part of a heart healthy diet. Dr. J. David Spence, a professor of neurology and clinical pharmacology at Western University and a cholesterol researcher, has recommended Egg Beaters for people who are at high risk for heart attacks and strokes.

== Variations ==
Egg Beaters are sold frozen or refrigerated in various size containers and seven varieties, Original, 100% Egg Whites, Garden Vegetable, Cheese & Chives, Southwestern Style, Three Cheese, and Florentine. Most contain no fat or cholesterol, and all provide substantially less food energy (calories), fat, and cholesterol than whole eggs.
