= Aquafaba =

Legume seed cooking water

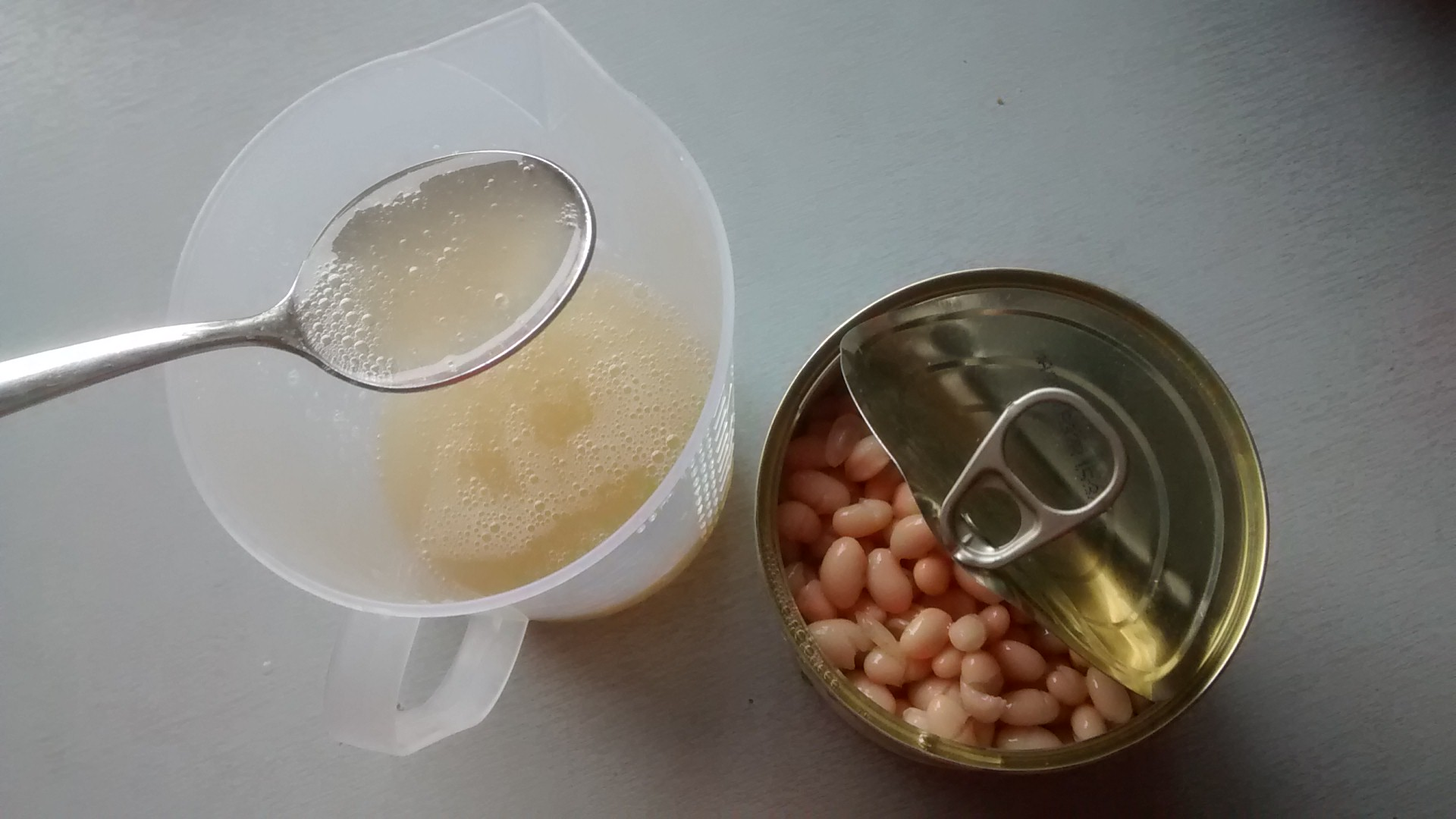
Aquafaba from a tin of white beans

Aquafaba (/ˌɑːkwəˈfɑːbə/ or /ˌækwəˈfɑːbə/) is the viscous water in which legume seeds such as chickpeas have been cooked. Its use in cuisine was thought to be discovered by the French musician Joël Roessel, and has been actively used as an ingredient in vegan cuisine for years.

Due to its ability to mimic functional properties of egg whites in cooking, aquafaba can be used as a direct replacement for them in some cases, including meringues and marshmallows.

== Origins ==
In December 2014, the French musician Joël Roessel found that water from canned beans can form foams much like protein isolates and flax mucilage do. Roessel shared his experiments on a blog and published recipes for floating island of Chaville, chocolate mousse, and meringue made from chickpea liquid to demonstrate its foaming capabilities.

Around the same time, vegan food enthusiast Goose Wohlt discovered that the cooking liquid can replace egg white without the need for stabilizers. In March 2015 he published a recipe for egg-free meringue using only chickpea liquid and sugar.

A few days later, a Facebook group was created to encourage development and popularize the egg substitute. The group discussed their experiments and techniques, and agreed on the term "aquafaba" coined by Goose Wohlt, from Latin aqua ("water") and faba ("bean"), noting that faba can also refer to "fabulous" or "fabaceae".

== Uses ==
Aquafaba is used as a replacement for eggs and egg white. Its composition of carbohydrates, proteins, and other soluble plant solids which have migrated from the seeds to the water during cooking gives it a wide spectrum of emulsifying, foaming, binding, gelatinizing and thickening properties.

In general one medium egg white can be replaced with 30 millilitres (2 tablespoons) of aquafaba, or one medium whole egg with 45 ml (3 tbsp).

The simplest way to obtain aquafaba is to decant the liquid from canned or boxed legumes such as white beans or chickpeas. It also can be made by boiling, steaming, pressure cooking, or microwaving pulses in water.

Sweet applications for aquafaba include meringues, macarons, nougat, icing, ice cream, fudge, and marshmallows. Savory applications include baked goods, dairy substitutes, mayonnaise, cheese substitutes, batters, and meat substitutes. Aquafaba is also recommended as a vegan substitute for egg white in preparing cocktails with a foamy "head", particularly sour cocktails like the whiskey sour.

Aquafaba contains about 10% of the protein of egg whites by weight. The difference in protein content may enable those who cannot properly metabolize proteins (such as phenylketonurics) to consume foods which are normally egg-based. The lower protein content makes it unsuitable for applications which rely on denatured egg protein for structure, such as angel food cakes.

Aquafaba produced from chickpeas and white beans (e.g., the Navy bean) is most similar to egg in terms culinary characteristics. Other legumes, such as peas, lentils, soy, kidney, and black beans can be used, but their slightly different compositions may require more adjustment of water content to work well.

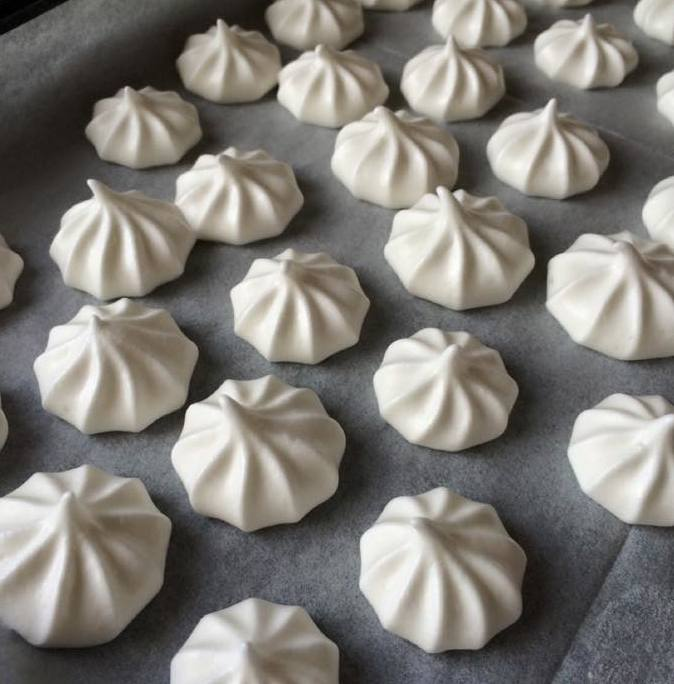
Meringue kisses made from aquafaba

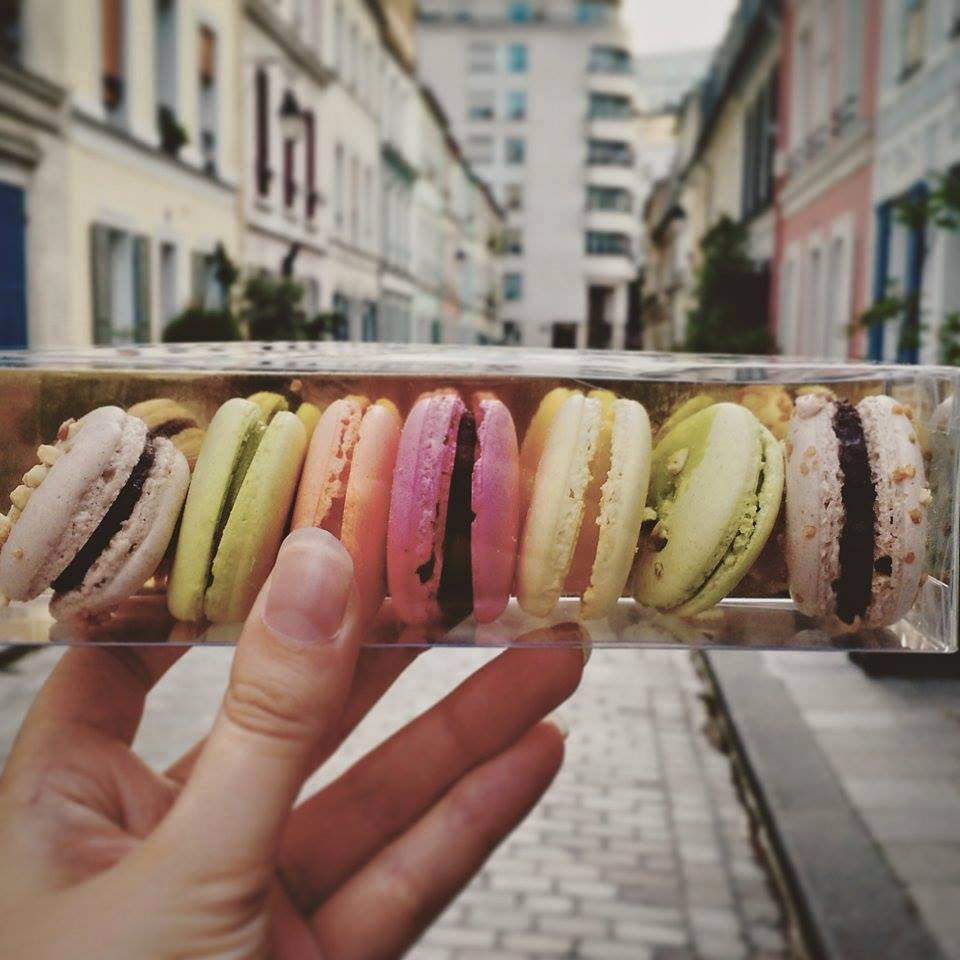
Aquafaba macarons

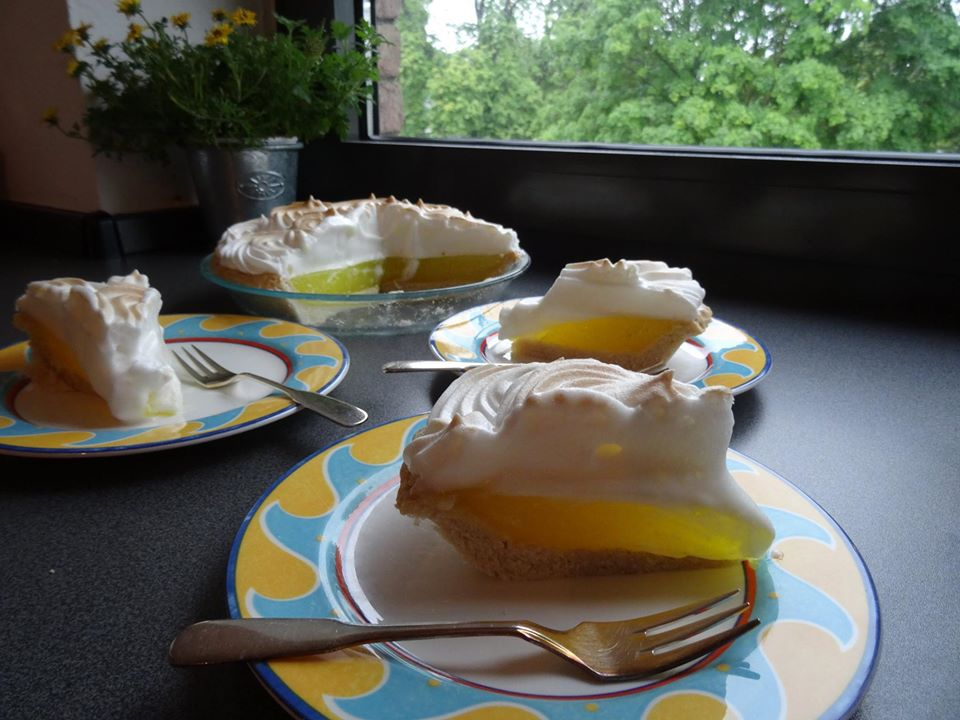
Aquafaba lemon meringue pie

== Composition ==
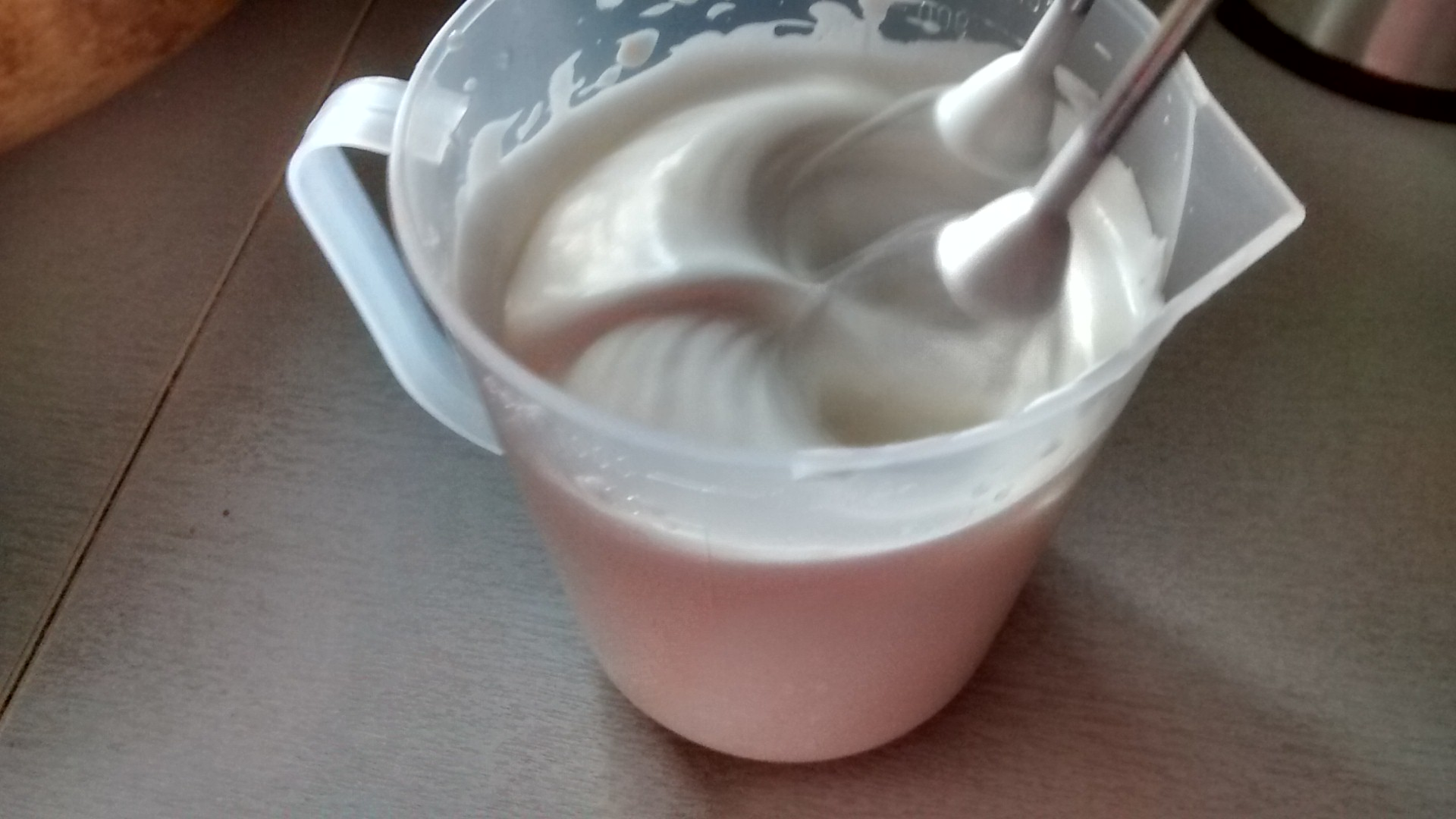
Whipped aquafaba

Legume seeds, or pulses, are primarily composed of carbohydrates (starch, sugars, and fiber), proteins (albumins and globulins), and water. The carbohydrates occur in higher concentrations than the proteins; the carbohydrates in legumes consist mostly of the polysaccharides amylose and amylopectin. Although composition varies, dried chickpeas at room temperature typically contain, by weight, 19% protein, 61% carbohydrate, 6% lipids, and 14% water. These amounts are approximate, and can vary by variety. During the process of cooking legume seeds, soluble carbohydrates and proteins in the seed dissolve, allowing them to enter the cooking water. More soluble material will be extracted from the beans when both the cooking temperature and the pressure are increased, as well as by extending the cooking time.

Once the legumes are cooked and filtered from the liquid, the filtered cooking liquid is referred to as "aquafaba". Comparing the final composition of cooked beans with raw ones shows that, under "normal" cooking conditions, approximately 5% of the initial composition of the bean has been dissolved into the cooking water. In 2018 the dry residue of aquafaba was found to consist mainly of carbohydrates (sugars, soluble fibre) and proteins. The ratio of carbohydrate to protein in aquafaba is approximately the same ratio as is found in the uncooked dry beans. Fat and starch, both present in the uncooked dry beans, were not detected. A concentration of 5% dry weight to water is typical for aquafaba, although the concentration can also be increased by heating the solution to allow evaporation of the water, increasing the solids concentration to 10% or more, depending on recipe requirements. This can be especially useful for applications in which emulsification and viscosity are more important characteristics than foamability. The concentration of soluble solids can also be tailored to produce a more stable foam, using less aquafaba, by scrupulously filtering non-soluble material from the solution and also by adjusting the concentration to the application at hand.

All else being equal, the concentration of aquafaba will vary according to:

- processing methods (prior industrial dehydration, pre-soaking)
- cooking conditions (pH, temperature, pressure and duration)
- legume variety (e.g.,'Kabuli' vs 'Desi' chickpeas)
- miscellaneous additives
- protein concentration
- carbohydrate type (sugar vs fibre) and concentration

== See also ==
- Egg substitute
- Egg white
- Veganism
