= Egg white =

Clear liquid contained within an egg

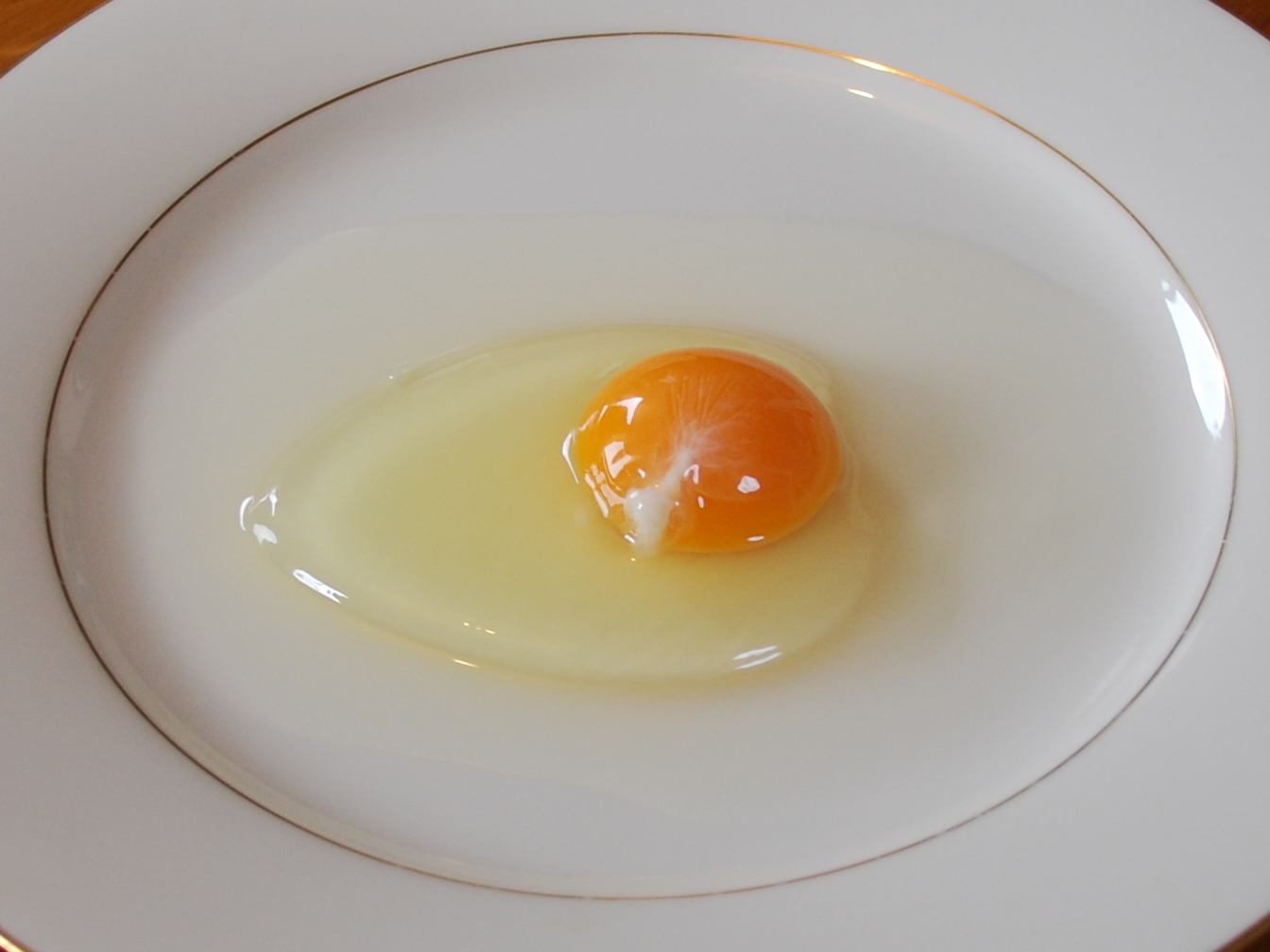
A raw egg with the round orange yolk (containing the visible white chalaza) in the center surrounded by the transparent yellow egg white.

Egg white is the clear liquid (also called the albumen or the glair/glaire) contained within an egg. In chickens, it is formed from the layers of secretions of the anterior section of the hen's oviduct during the passage of the egg. It forms around fertilized or unfertilized egg yolks. The primary natural purpose of egg white is to protect the yolk and provide additional nutrition for the growth of the embryo (when fertilized). Egg white consists of about 90% water into which about 10% proteins (including albumins, mucoproteins, and globulins) are dissolved. Unlike the yolk, which is high in lipids (fats), egg white contains almost no fat, and carbohydrate content is less than 1%. Egg whites contain about 56% of the protein in the egg. Egg white has many uses in food (e.g. meringue, mousse) as well as many other uses (e.g. in the preparation of vaccines such as those for influenza).

== Composition ==
Egg white makes up around two-thirds of a chicken egg by weight. Water constitutes about 90% of this, with protein, trace minerals, fatty material, vitamins, and glucose contributing the remainder. A raw U.S. large egg contains around 33 grams of egg white with 3.6 grams of protein, 0.24 grams of carbohydrate and 55 milligrams of sodium. It contains no cholesterol and the energy content is about 17 calories. Egg white is an alkaline solution and contains around 149 proteins. The table below lists the major proteins in egg whites by percentage and their natural functions.

Protein content of egg white
Protein	Abundance
Ovalbumin	54%
Ovotransferrin	12%
Ovomucoid	11%
Ovoglobulin G2	4%
Ovoglobulin G3	4%
Ovomucin	3.5%
Lysozyme	3.4%
Ovoinhibitor	1.5%
Ovoglycoprotein	1%
Flavoprotein	0.8%
Ovomacroglobulin	0.5%
Avidin	0.05%
Cystatin	0.05%

Ovalbumin is the most abundant protein in albumen. Classed as phosphoglycoprotein, during storage, it converts into s-ovalbumin (5% at the time of laying) and can reach up to 80% after six months of cold storage. Ovalbumin in solution is heat-resistant. Denaturation temperature is around 84 °C, but it can be easily denatured by physical stress. Conalbumin/ovotransferrin is a glycoprotein which has the capacity to bind the bi- and trivalent metal cations into a complex and is more heat sensitive than ovalbumin. At its isoelectric pH (6.5), it can bind two cations and assume a red or yellow color. These metal complexes are more heat stable than the native state. Ovomucoid is the major allergen from egg white and is a heat-resistant glycoprotein found to be a trypsin inhibitor. Lysozyme is a holoprotein which can lyse the wall of certain Gram-positive bacteria and is found at high levels in the chalaziferous layer and the chalazae which anchor the yolk towards the middle of the egg. Ovomucin is a glycoprotein which may contribute to the gel-like structure of thick albumen. The amount of ovomucin in the thick albumen is four times as great as in the thin albumen.

== Foam ==
Visual representation of protein denaturation. A globular protein becomes unfolded when exposed to heat.

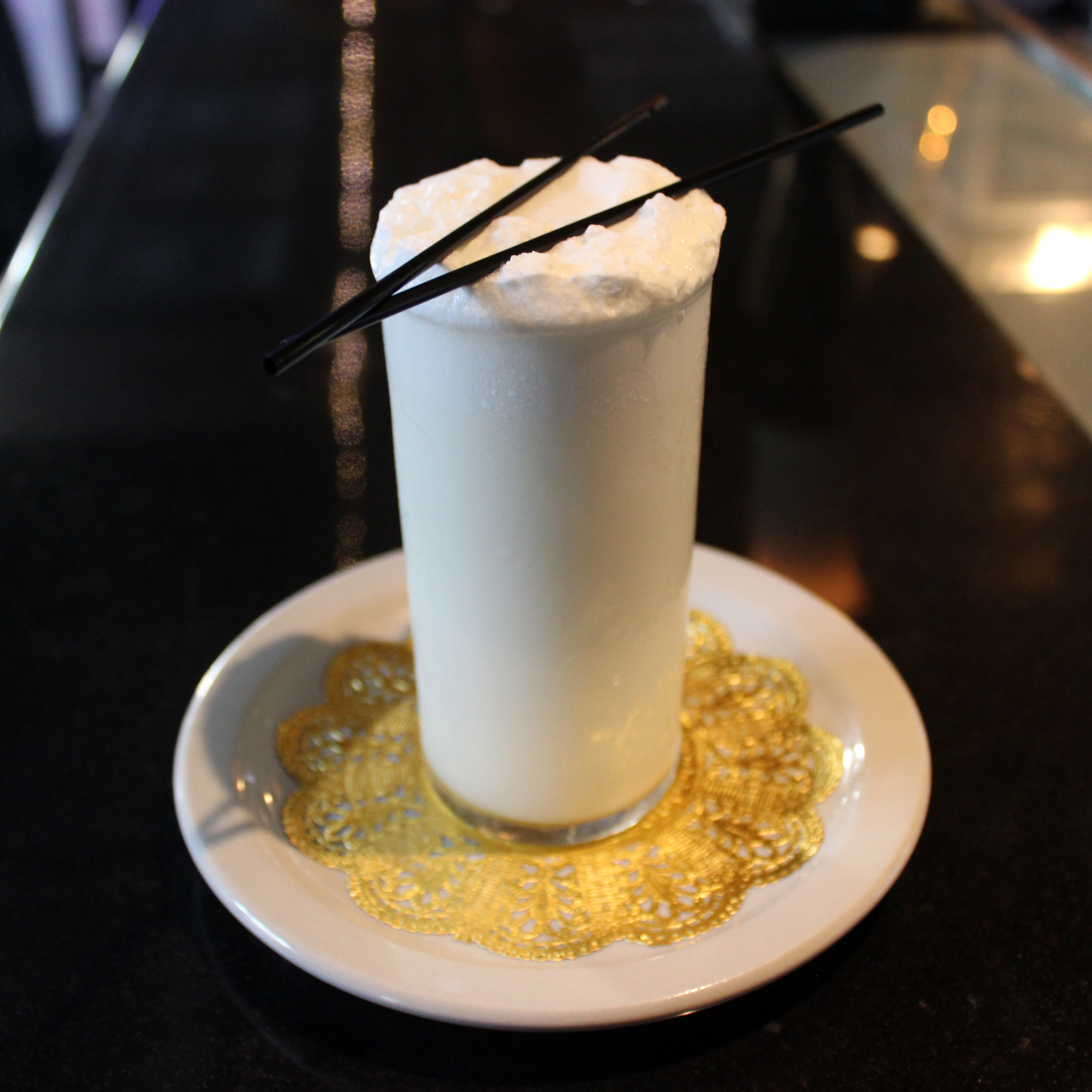
Aerated egg whites are frequently employed in shaken cocktail recipes, such as this Ramos gin fizz, for textural and aesthetic purposes.

The physical stress of beating egg whites can create a foam. Two types of physical stress are caused by beating them with a whisk: denaturation and coagulation.

Denaturation occurs as the whisk drags the liquid through itself, creating a force that unfolds the protein molecules.

Coagulation comes from the mixing of air into the whites, which causes the proteins to come out of their natural state. These denatured proteins gather together where the air and water meet and create multiple bonds with the other unraveled proteins, and thus become a foam, holding the incorporated air in place; because the proteins consist of amino acids, some are hydrophilic (attracted to water) and some are hydrophobic (repelled by water).

When beating egg whites, they are classified in three stages according to the peaks they form when the beater is lifted: soft, firm, and stiff peaks. Overbeaten eggs take on a dry appearance, and eventually collapse. Egg whites do not beat up correctly if they are exposed to any form of fat, such as cooking oils or the fats contained in egg yolk.

Copper bowls have been used in France since the 18th century to stabilize egg foams. The copper in the bowl assists in creating a tighter bond in reactive sulfur items such as egg whites. The bond created is so tight that the sulfurs are prevented from reacting with any other material. A silver-plated bowl has the same result as the copper bowl, as will a pinch of powdered copper supplement from a health store used in a glass bowl. Drawbacks of the copper bowl include the expense of the bowl itself, and that the bowls are difficult to keep clean. Copper contamination from the bowl is minimal, as a cup of foam contains a tenth of a human's normal daily intake level.

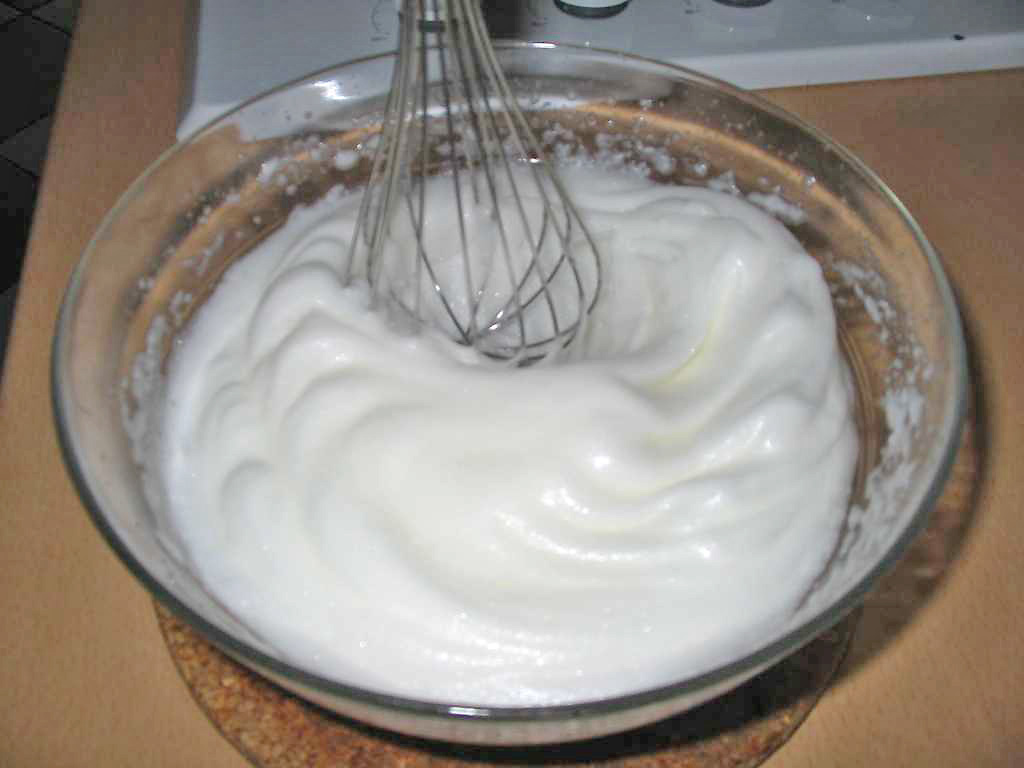
Beaten egg whites

== Health issues ==
Although egg whites are prized as a source of low-fat, high-protein nutrition, a small number of people cannot eat them. Egg allergy is more common among infants than adults, and most children will outgrow it by the age of five. Allergic reactions against egg white are more common than reactions against egg yolks. In addition to true allergic reactions, some people experience a food intolerance to egg whites.

Eggs are susceptible to Salmonella contamination. Thorough cooking eliminates the direct threat (i.e. cooked egg whites that are solid and not runny), but the threat of cross-contamination remains if people handle contaminated eggs and then touch other foods or items in the kitchen, thus spreading the bacteria. In August 2010, the FDA ordered the recall of 380 million eggs because of possible Salmonella contamination.

Cooked eggs are a good source of biotin. However, daily consumption of raw egg whites for several months may result in biotin deficiency, due to their avidin content, as the avidin tightly binds biotin and prevents its absorption.

== Uses ==
=== Food ===
Egg white is a fining agent that can be used in the clarification and stabilization of wine. Egg white can also be added to shaken cocktails to create a delicate froth. Some protein powders also use egg whites as a primary source of protein.

=== Art and cultural heritage ===
The albumen from egg white was used as a binding agent in early photography during an 1855–90 period; such prints were called albumen prints.

Egg whites are used as adhesive. In bookbinding, egg white (called glaire in this context) is used to adhere gold leaf in gold tooling. In manuscripts, egg white (or yolk) can be used as a binder for pigments.

== See also ==
- Aquafaba
- Egg yolk
- Egg white substitutes
- Egg Beaters
- Albumen print
- Haugh unit, a unit of measure for egg albumen
- Meringue, a dessert or dessert ingredient made from egg white
- Protein quality
