= Ovomucin =

Protein complex in bird egg white

Alpha-ovomucin

Identifiers
- Organism: Gallus gallus
- Symbol: MUC5B
- UniProt: Q98UI9
Search for
- Structures: Swiss-model
- Domains: InterPro

Beta-ovomucin

Identifiers
- Organism: Gallus gallus
- Symbol: MUC6
- UniProt: F1NBL0
Search for
- Structures: Swiss-model
- Domains: InterPro

Ovomucin is a glycoprotein found mainly in egg whites, as well as in the chalaza and vitelline membrane. The protein makes up around 2-4% of the protein content of egg whites; like other members of the mucin protein family, ovomucin confers gel-like properties. It is composed of two subunits, alpha-ovomucin (MUC5B) and beta-ovomucin (MUC6), of which the beta subunit is much more heavily glycosylated. The alpha subunit has a high number of acidic amino acids, while the beta subunit has more hydroxyl amino acids. The protein has a carbohydrate content of around 33%, featuring at least three unique types of carbohydrate side chains. It is known to possess a wide range of biological activities, including regulating cell functions and promoting the production of macrophages, lymphocytes, and cytokines, suggesting that it plays a role in the immune system.
