= Plasma protein binding =

Phenomenon of medications attaching to blood proteins

Plasma protein binding refers to the degree to which medications attach to blood proteins within the blood plasma. A drug's efficacy may be affected by the degree to which it binds. The less bound a drug is, the more efficiently it can traverse or diffuse through cell membranes. Common blood proteins that drugs bind to are human serum albumin, lipoprotein, glycoprotein, and α, β‚ and γ globulins.

== Binding (drug distribution) ==
A drug in blood exists in two forms: bound and unbound. Depending on a specific drug's affinity for plasma proteins, a proportion of the drug may become bound to the proteins, with the remainder being unbound. If the protein binding is reversible, then a chemical equilibrium will exist between the bound and unbound states, such that:

Protein + drug ⇌ Protein-drug complex

Notably, it is the unbound fraction which exhibits pharmacologic effects. It is also the fraction that may be metabolized and/or excreted. For example, the "fraction bound" of the anticoagulant warfarin is 97%. This means that out of the amount of warfarin in the blood, 97% is bound to plasma proteins. The remaining 3% (the fraction unbound) is the fraction that is actually active and may be excreted.

Protein binding can influence the drug's biological half-life. The bound portion may act as a reservoir or depot from which the drug is slowly released as the unbound form. Since the unbound form is being metabolized and/or excreted from the body, the bound fraction will be released in order to maintain equilibrium.

Since albumin is alkalotic, acidic and neutral drugs will primarily bind to albumin. If albumin becomes saturated, then these drugs will bind to lipoprotein. Basic drugs will bind to the acidic alpha-1 acid glycoprotein. This is significant because various medical conditions may affect the levels of albumin, alpha-1 acid glycoprotein, and lipoproteins.

== Impact of the altered protein binding ==
Only the unbound fraction of the drug undergoes metabolism in the liver and other tissues. As the drug dissociates from the protein, more and more drug undergoes metabolism. Changes in the levels of free drug change the volume of distribution because free drug may distribute into the tissues leading to a decrease in the plasma concentration profile. For the drugs which rapidly undergo metabolism, clearance is dependent on the hepatic blood flow. For drugs which slowly undergo metabolism, changes in the unbound fraction of the drug directly change the clearance of the drug.

The most commonly used methods for measuring drug concentration levels in the plasma measure bound as well as unbound fractions of the drug.

The fraction unbound can be altered by a number of variables, such as the concentration of drug in the body, the amount and quality of plasma protein, and other drugs that bind to plasma proteins. Higher drug concentrations would lead to a higher fraction unbound, because the plasma protein would be saturated with drug and any excess drug would be unbound. If the amount of plasma protein is decreased (such as in catabolism, malnutrition, liver disease, renal disease), there would also be a higher fraction unbound. Additionally, the quality of the plasma protein may affect how many drug-binding sites there are on the protein.

=== Drug interactions ===
Using 2 drugs at the same time can sometimes affect each other's fraction unbound. For example, assume that Drug A and Drug B are both protein-bound drugs. If Drug A is given, it will bind to the plasma proteins in the blood. If Drug B is also given, it can displace Drug A from the protein, thereby increasing Drug A's fraction unbound. This may increase the effects of Drug A, since only the unbound fraction may exhibit activity.

| | Before displacement | After displacement | % increase in unbound fraction |
|---|---|---|---|
| Drug A | | | |
| % bound | 95 | 90 | |
| % unbound | 5 | 10 | +100 |
| Drug B | | | |
| % bound | 50 | 45 | |
| % unbound | 50 | 55 | +10 |

Note that for Drug A, the % increase in unbound fraction is 100% – hence, Drug A's pharmacological effect can potentially double (depending on whether the free molecules get to their target before they are eliminated by metabolism or excretion). This change in pharmacologic effect could have adverse consequences.

However, this effect is really only noticeable in closed systems where the pool of available proteins could potentially be exceeded by the number of drug molecules. Biological systems, such as humans and animals, are open systems where molecules can be gained, lost or redistributed and where the protein pool capacity is almost never exceeded by the number of drug molecules. A drug that is 99% bound means that 99% of the drug molecules are bound to blood proteins not that 99% of the blood proteins are bound with drug. When two, highly protein-bound drugs (A and B) are added into the same biological system it will lead to an initial small increase in the concentration of free drug A (as drug B ejects some of the drug A from its proteins). However, this free drug A is now more available for redistribution into the body tissues and/or for excretion. This means the total amount of drug in the system will decrease quite rapidly, keeping the free drug fraction (the concentration of free drug divided by the total drug concentration) constant and yielding almost no change in clinical effect.

The effects of drugs displacing each other and changing the clinical effect (though important in some examples) is vastly overestimated usually and a common example incorrectly used to display the importance of this effect is the anticoagulant warfarin. Warfarin is highly protein-bound (>95%) and has a low therapeutic index. Since a low therapeutic index indicates that there is a high risk of toxicity when using the drug, any potential increases in warfarin concentration could be very dangerous and lead to hemorrhage. In horses, it is very true that if warfarin and phenylbutazone are administered concurrently, the horse can develop bleeding issues which can be fatal. This is often explained as being due to the effect of phenylbutazone ejecting warfarin from its plasma protein, thus increasing the concentration of free warfarin and increasing its anticoagulant effect. However, the real problem is that phenylbutazone interferes with the liver's ability to metabolize warfarin so free warfarin cannot be metabolized properly or excreted. This leads to an increase in free warfarin and the resulting bleeding problems.

== See also ==
- Blood proteins
- Pharmacokinetics
