= Pregnancy zone protein =

Protein-coding gene in the species Homo sapiens

PZP

Identifiers
- Aliases: PZP, CPAMD6, alpha-2-macroglobulin like, PZP alpha-2-macroglobulin like
- External IDs: OMIM: 176420; MGI: 87854; GeneCards: PZP

Gene location (Human)
Chr.	Chromosome 12 (human)
Band	12p13.31	Start	9,148,840 bp
Band	12p13.31	End	9,208,395 bp

Gene location (Mouse)
Chr.	Chromosome 6 (mouse)
Band	6 F3|6 63.02 cM	Start	128,460,530 bp
Band	6 F3|6 63.02 cM	End	128,503,683 bp
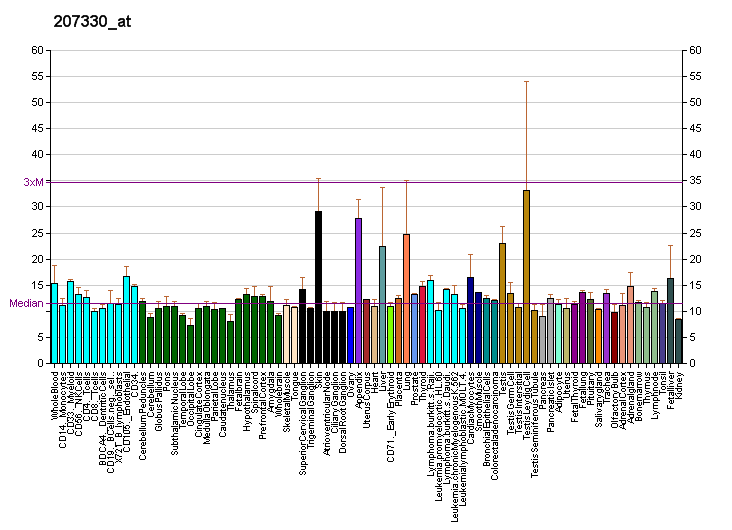
RNA expression pattern
Bgee	Human / Mouse (ortholog); Top expressed in: bronchial epithelial cell; mucosa of paranasal sinus; liver; right lobe of liver; testicle; epithelium of nasopharynx; sperm; olfactory zone of nasal mucosa; endothelial cell; apex of heart / Top expressed in: left lobe of liver; gallbladder; right kidney; proximal tubule; human fetus; fetal liver hematopoietic progenitor cell; human kidney; morula; sexually immature organism; blastocyst; More reference expression data
BioGPS	More reference expression data
Gene ontology
Molecular function	peptidase inhibitor activity; endopeptidase inhibitor activity; serine-type endopeptidase inhibitor activity; protease binding
Cellular component	extracellular region; blood microparticle; extracellular exosome; extracellular space; collagen-containing extracellular matrix
Biological process	female pregnancy; negative regulation of peptidase activity; negative regulation of endopeptidase activity
Sources:Amigo / QuickGO
Orthologs
Databases	NCBI: entry; OMA: entry
Species	Human	Mouse
Entrez	5858	11287
Ensembl	ENSG00000126838	ENSMUSG00000030359
UniProt	P20742	Q61838
RefSeq (mRNA)	NM_002864	NM_007376
RefSeq (protein)	n/a	n/a
Location (UCSC)	Chr 12: 9.15 – 9.21 Mb	Chr 6: 128.46 – 128.5 Mb
PubMed search
- Wikidata
View/Edit Human	View/Edit Mouse

Pregnancy zone protein (PZP), also known as the pregnancy-associated α_{2}-glycoprotein (α_{2}-PAG or PAα_{2}G), is a protein which in humans is encoded by the PZP gene on chromosome 12. PZP is part of the alpha-2 globulin family of proteins. It is often associated with pregnancy, during which it can be the most abundant among the plasma proteins. PZP is believed to play a role in immune-regulation during pregnancy, however many aspects of its mechanism, function and structure are yet to be determined. Recent research has largely focused on determining how dysregulated PZP levels can act as a markers of various diseases.

== Discovery ==
The first publication reporting PZP was produced in 1959 by O. Smithies. This was a result of an experimental process using starch gel zone-electrophoresis, which detected a protein band in the sera of 10% of the studied women in late pregnancy and after delivery. Over the following years the detection of the protein was improved by researchers such as J. F. Afonso and R. R. Alvarez.

=== Nomenclature ===
Since its discovery, PZP has been synonymously referred to by numerous names in scholarly literature. These include the following: α2-pregnoglobulin, pregnancy-associated α2-glycoprotein, α-acute-phase glycoprotein, alpha-2-macroglobulin like, Xh-antigen, Schwangerschaftsprotein-3, Pα-1, pregnancy-associated α-macroglobulin, pregnancy-associated globulin, and α2-PAG.

== Gene expression and protein localisation ==
The PZP gene contains 36 exons and is located on the short arm of chromosome 12 at position 12-13. The PZP gene encodes a transcript of 1482 base pairs for translation. The Protein Data Bank provides information on a coding sequence length of 4446 nucleotides. A number of tissues, such as the uterus, liver, and brain, have PZP expressed in them. The presence of PZP has been detected in blood plasma, cerebral spinal fluid, and synovial fluid.

In healthy adults and children in normal conditions, both male and female, PZP itself has been found to be present in low levels. The amount of PZP in the plasma of healthy people in normal conditions has been identified as <0.03 mg/mL while for pregnant women this can rise to be at concentrations of 0.5 - 3.0 mg/mL.

A 1976 study observing the roles of contraceptives on PZP amounts, resulted in speculation that estrogen plays some role in controlling PZP expression. An earlier, 1971 study involving contraceptives, has noted that different PZP responses were created by different types of pills, posing questions about the effect of pill composition on the results.

The clone EPZP6 isolated from a human genomic library, has been observed to be a genomic clone of PZP.

== Protein structure ==
Pregnancy zone proteins (PZPs) exist in the functionally active form as homodimers of 360 kDa molecular weights. This dimerisation of the constituent 180 kDa monomers happens by means of disulfide bridge bonds. PZPs are secreted in highly glycosylated form. The structure has been confirmed experimentally when denaturation of PZP demonstrated the 360 kDa entity, while subsequent reduction - subunits of 180 kDa. Of the latter, some were shown to be partially fragmented to 90 kDa as a result of cleavage.

On each PZP subunit there is a thiol-ester group, a signal domain, a bait region and a receptor binding domain. The bait region has numerous protease cleavage sites, while the binding domain is for low density lipoprotein receptor-related protein (LRP). A study of the bait domain has shown a rare polymorphism occurring, with either Valine or Methionine being at the sixth amino acid position. Also, a polymorphism of the nucleotides Adenine/Guanine has been observed at base pair 4097, while a Proline/Threonine polymorphism has been noted at the amino acid position 1180.

A PZP contains numerous sites of N-glycosylation, noted at the following residues: Asn1430, Asn997, Asn932, Asn875, Asn753, Asn406, Asn392, Asn246, Asn69, Asn54. The protein has an amino acid sequence which is 71% equivalent to that of alpha-2-Macroglobulin (α2M).

The minimal knowledge available about the PZP multi-domain fold allows only an approximation of its tertiary structure based on that of a transformed α2M at 4.3 Å resolution. As of November 2018, no crystal structure of PZP is available at the Protein Data Bank.

A 1988 study of PZPs and three of its derivatives using monoclonal antibodies, showed that there is a possibility of a minimum of three various conformational states for PZP and its derivatives. In another study, experimentally, the hydrophobic surfaces displayed by α2M and PZP have been used to note that the conformational states of these two proteins display significant differences.

== Biological activity and functions ==
Over many years PZP has been classified as a protease inhibitor, however, as was observed in a paper in 2016, more recently, the suggestion of the roles of a T-helper cell modulator and/or an extracellular chaperone has been made. In a wider context, however, the specific biological significance of PZP is yet to be determined.

Despite early claims of PZP playing a role analogous to α2M, the latter shows inhibitory action against many more proteases than the former. In contrast to this, while PZP and PAI-2 display no obvious structural similarities, they show functional commonalities and complementary activity in extracellular fluids.

It may be possible that during pregnancy, PZP and placental protein-14 (PP14) act together, in order to inhibit the activation of T-helper 1 (Th1). If this is the case, this would consequently create protection against the maternal immune system attacking the foetus. A suggested mechanism for the immunoregulatory function of PZP includes the proposal that PZP noncovalently sequesters ligands like IL-6.72, IL-2 and tumor necrosis factor-α. It has been noted that PZP levels as such may not directly correlate with the inhibition ability of PZP, as this is also impacted by polymorphisms such as those in the bait domain.

Amy R. Wyatt et al. observe that there is no substantial evidence to support suggestions of PZP being involved in the control intracellular protease activities including those of chymotrypsin-like enzymes. It is thought that PZP together with dimeric α2M aid in the clearance of pro-inflammatory cytokines and proteins that are misfolded. It is due to the greater hydrophobic interactive properties displayed by PZP in comparison with tetrameric α2M, that functions of PZP such as holdase-type chaperone activity have been suggested.

Due to faster interactions displayed between PZP with tissue-type plasminogen activator (tPA) than those of α2M and tPA, it has been proposed that since tPA is the major serine proteinase in the plasma fibrinolytic system, it may in fact be PZP that plays a role in controlling fibrinolytically-derived proteinases during pregnancy.

=== Binding observations ===
The macromolecules which the PZP has been shown to bind include those associated with pregnancy, such as the placenta growth factor, glycodelin, and the vascular endothelial growth factor.

It has been stated that more compact, transformed conformations of PZP occur as a result of thioester bond cleavage of the PZP resulting from interaction with small amine molecules or proteases. The mechanisms of how these transformed PZPs, complexed with proteases, act as ligands for LRP are still enigmatic.

It has been demonstrated that PZP has plasmin-binding capabilities.

== Comparison with alpha-2-macroglobulin ==
α2M and PZP have been shown to have a similar primary structure. This has led to suggestions that the two proteins are evolutionarily related.

A 1984 study had previously indicated a 68% identicality of the residues of PZP that had been sequenced at that time, and those of α2M. The bait region, has however been shown to be significantly different in the two proteins. Cysteine residues have on the other hand been observed to be retained between α2M and PZP. The presence of common antigenic determinants between PZP and α2M has also been suggested.

Functionally, α2M and PZP have both been shown to be protease inhibitors. Nevertheless, the point that PZP is generally elevated only during pregnancy, while α2M is found in concentrations of 1.5-2.0 mg/mL in plasma consistently and regardless of pregnancy, supports greater diversion of their functions.

== Links to diseases and health conditions ==
Observations have been made of PZP being associated with various diseases and conditions.

Links of heightened PZP levels to later onset of Alzheimer's disease (AD) have been observed, with the PZP potentially originating in the brain. Furthermore, in postmortem examinations, the immunoreactivity of PZP in the cortex of AD patients was specifically seen in the microglial cells associated with senile plaques, and in some neurons.

While PZP has been shown to be non-specific enough for use in HIV-1 diagnosis, it has been suggested as having potential value as a marker of prognosis if changes in PZP levels over time in HIV-1 patients are found to correspond to response to therapy and disease course.

In a 2018 study, a novel observation was made that in the serum of patients with Diabetes mellitus 1 (DM1) PZP was found to be downregulated.

A significant correlation has also been shown between the severity of bronchiectasis and levels of PZP detected in sputum.

A study using mice serum to observe the role of proteins including PZP in identification of inflammatory bowel disease deduced that PZP may be used as one of a panel of six proteins proposed as a combined biomarker signature.

PZP levels were found to not differ significantly in breast cancer patients, thus deeming this protein ineligible as a biomarker of this disease. PZP expression in relation to in-vitro fertilisation (IVF) has also been studied, showing upregulation. PZP was shown to be one the proteins determined as potential biomarkers of Poor Ovarian Responder (POR) in IVF.

Low PZP concentrations have also been linked to miscarriage during the early stages of pregnancy.

== Modulation by estrogens ==
The hepatic synthesis of PZP is modulated by estrogens, and PZP is by far the most estrogen-sensitive hepatic protein known. High doses of oral estrogens increase PZP levels by 20- to 30-fold, whereas sex hormone-binding globulin (SHBG) levels are increased only by 5- to 10-fold. Birth control pills increase PZP levels by about 10-fold. Pregnancy, during which time estradiol levels strongly increase, is associated with 50- to 100-fold increased PZP levels. Besides estrogens, selective estrogen receptor modulators (SERMs) like tamoxifen increase PZP levels.

The synthetic estrogen ethinylestradiol (EE) shows strongly disproportionate effect on PZP and SHBG levels compared to natural estradiol. Whereas 2 mg/day oral estradiol valerate increased PZP levels by 34%, 10 μg/day and 30 μg/day oral EE increased PZP by 496% and 790%, respectively. EE was estimated to have 241-fold the potency of estradiol valerate in terms of suppression follicle-stimulating hormone (FSH) levels, 2,918-fold the potency in terms of increased PZP levels, and 779-fold the potency in terms of increased SHBG levels. Oral estradiol also shows greater impact on PZP levels than transdermal estradiol. In a study of high-dose polyestradiol phosphate (160 mg/4 weeks) by intramuscular injection, with resulting estradiol levels of about 400 pg/mL, PZP levels did not meaningfully change. These findings indicate that both type of estrogen and route of administration modify the influence of estrogens on liver protein synthesis as well as associated estrogenic effects.
