= Beta globulin =

Schematic representation of a protein electrophoresis gel

Beta globulins are a group of globular proteins in plasma that are more mobile in alkaline or electrically charged solutions than gamma globulins, but less mobile than alpha globulins.

Examples of beta globulins include:

- beta-2 microglobulin
- plasminogen
- angiostatins
- properdin
- sex hormone-binding globulin
- transferrin
- lactoferrin
