= Globular protein =

Spherical, water-soluble type of protein

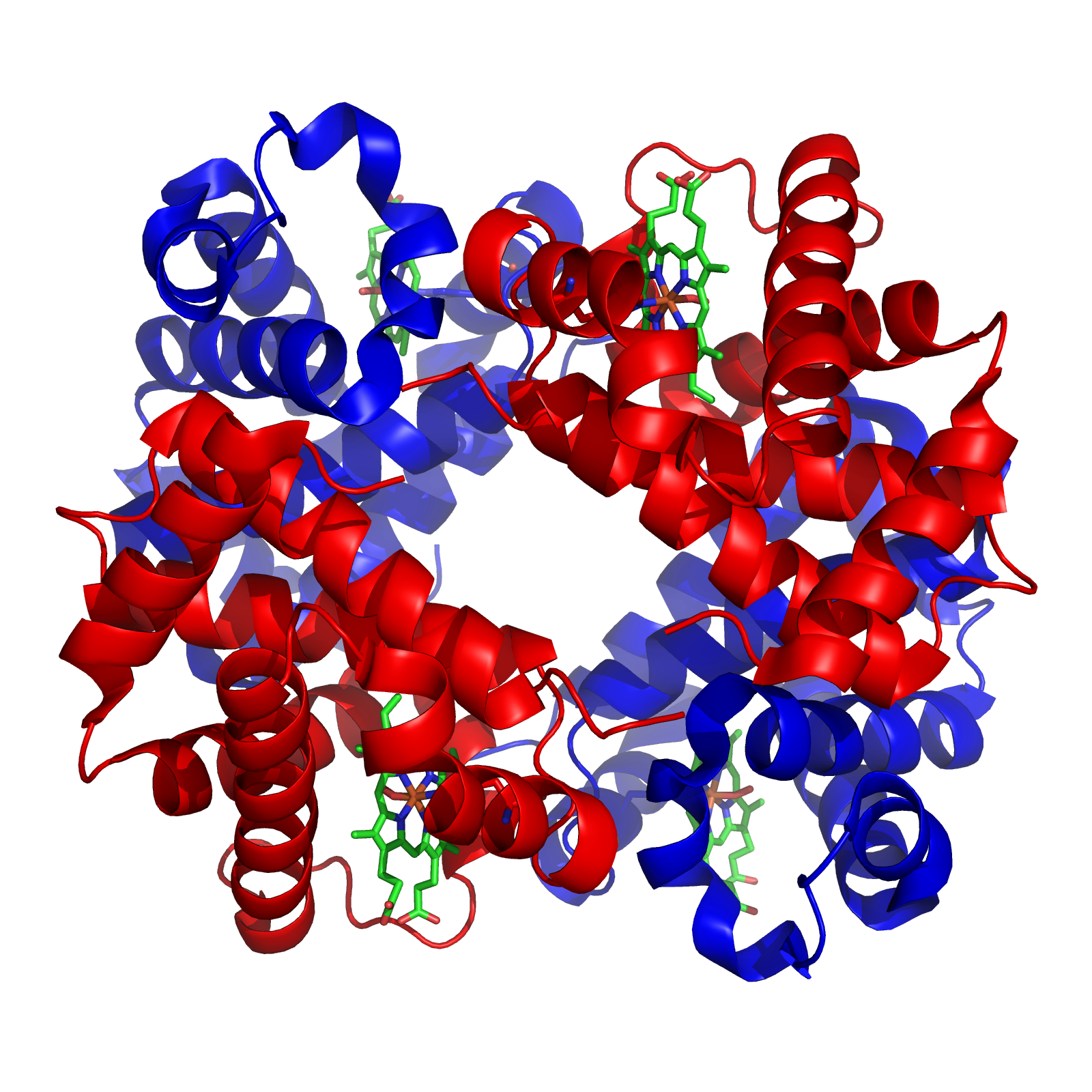
3-dimensional structure of hemoglobin, a globular protein.

In biochemistry, globular proteins or spheroproteins are spherical ("globe-like") proteins and are one of the common protein types (the others being fibrous, disordered and membrane proteins). Globular proteins are somewhat water-soluble (forming colloids in water), unlike the fibrous or membrane proteins. There are multiple fold classes of globular proteins, since there are many different architectures that can fold into a roughly spherical shape.

The term globin can refer more specifically to proteins including the globin fold.

== Globular structure and solubility ==
The term globular protein is quite old (dating probably from the 19th century) and is now somewhat archaic given the hundreds of thousands of proteins and more elegant and descriptive structural motif vocabulary. The globular nature of these proteins can be determined without the means of modern techniques, but only by using ultracentrifuges or dynamic light scattering techniques.

The spherical structure is induced by the protein's tertiary structure. The molecule's apolar (hydrophobic) amino acids are bounded towards the molecule's interior whereas polar (hydrophilic) amino acids are bound outwards, allowing dipole–dipole interactions with the solvent, which explains the molecule's solubility.

Globular proteins are only marginally stable because the free energy released when the protein folded into its native conformation is relatively small. This is because protein folding requires entropic cost. As a primary sequence of a polypeptide chain can form numerous conformations, native globular structure restricts its conformation to a few only. It results in a decrease in randomness, although non-covalent interactions such as hydrophobic interactions stabilize the structure.

=== Protein folding ===
Although it is still unknown how proteins fold up naturally, new evidence has helped advance understanding. Part of the protein folding problem is that several non-covalent, weak interactions are formed, such as hydrogen bonds and Van der Waals interactions. Via several techniques, the mechanism of protein folding is currently being studied. Even in the protein's denatured state, it can be folded into the correct structure.

Globular proteins seem to have two mechanisms for protein folding, either the diffusion-collision model or nucleation condensation model, although recent findings have shown globular proteins, such as PTP-BL PDZ2, that fold with characteristic features of both models. These new findings have shown that the transition states of proteins may affect the way they fold. The folding of globular proteins has also recently been connected to treatment of diseases, and anti-cancer ligands have been developed which bind to the folded but not the natural protein. These studies have shown that the folding of globular proteins affects its function.

By the second law of thermodynamics, the free energy difference between unfolded and folded states is contributed by enthalpy and entropy changes. As the free energy difference in a globular protein that results from folding into its native conformation is small, it is marginally stable, thus providing a rapid turnover rate and effective control of protein degradation and synthesis.

== Role ==
Unlike fibrous proteins which only play a structural function, globular proteins can act as:

- Enzymes, by catalyzing organic reactions taking place in the organism in mild conditions and with a great specificity. Different esterases fulfill this role.
- Messengers, by transmitting messages to regulate biological processes. This function is done by hormones, i.e. insulin etc.
- Transporters of other molecules through membranes
- Stocks of amino acids.
- Regulatory roles are also performed by globular proteins rather than fibrous proteins.
- Structural proteins, e.g., actin and tubulin, which are globular and soluble as monomers, but polymerize to form long, stiff fibers

== Members ==
Among the most known globular proteins is hemoglobin, a member of the globin protein family. Other globular proteins are the alpha, beta and gamma (IgA, IgD, IgE, IgG and IgM) globulin. See protein electrophoresis for more information on the different globulins. Nearly all enzymes with major metabolic functions are globular in shape, as well as many signal transduction proteins.

Albumins are also globular proteins, although, unlike all of the other globular proteins, they are completely soluble in water. They are not soluble in oil.
