= PZP =

PZP may refer to:

- Movement for Changes (Pokret za promjene), a political party in Montenegro
- Movement for Reversal (Pokret za preokret), a political party in Serbia
- Porcine zona pellucida, a source of antigens for immunocontraception
- Pregnancy zone protein, a human protein coded by the PZP gene
