= Globulin =

Family of globular proteins

The globulins are a family of globular proteins that have higher molecular weights than albumins and are insoluble in pure water but dissolve in dilute salt solutions. Some globulins are produced in the liver, while others are made by the immune system. Globulins, albumins, and fibrinogen are the major blood proteins. The normal concentration of globulins in human blood is about 2.6-3.5 g/dL.

The term "globulin" is sometimes used synonymously with "globular protein". However, albumins are also globular proteins, but are not globulins. All other serum globular proteins are globulins.

== Types of globulin ==
Schematic representation of a protein electrophoresis gel

All globulins fall into one of three categories:

- Alpha globulins
- Beta globulins
- Gamma globulins (one group of gamma globulins is the immunoglobulins, which are also known as "antibodies")

Globulins can be distinguished from one another using serum protein electrophoresis.

Globulins exert oncotic pressure. Their deficiency results in loss of carrier functions of globulins, oedema due to decreased oncotic pressure, and susceptibility to infections due to decreased gamma-globulins (immuno-globulins) leading to decreased production of antibodies.

Globulins are mainly divided into three different sections depending on their electrophoretic mobility. The main sections for globulin would be the alpha globulins, beta globulin, and gamma globulin. The alpha globulins and the beta globulin are mainly created in the liver and the gamma globulin are made by lymphocytes and plasma cells in lymphoid tissue.

These globulins should consist of non-albumin proteins and there could be about a hundred different proteins that are included in the globulins. One group of proteins that are in the globulins is created in return for the inflammatory stimuli.

There is a certain equation to figure out the value of globulin. The equation goes by this Globulins = Total protein - Albumin since it should not have an albumin protein within the globulin. Usually, the concentration of globulin is measured either in grams per liter or milligrams per deciliter.

To check an accurate amount of immunoglobulins would be the radial immunodiffusion which replaced the immunoelectrophoretic which used to determine the accurate amount of immunoglobulin.

Globulins can be some of the most abundant storage proteins. Globulins have different solubilities such as the salt-soluble 7S and 11S-globulins. The solubility of globulins is determined by different fluorescence spectroscopy and urea sensitivity depending on the molecules that were studied.

There was a study conducted to see the reaction of a human globulin with an erythrocyte surface which showed that a human globulin fixes to the erythrocytes in a non-related immune response fashion. Also, the globulin that was fixed on the erythrocyte has the trait to exchange with a globulin in a certain medium.

Globulins aren't only a major blood protein, but can also be sex hormone-binding globulin. This type of globulin can transport androgens and estradiol in the blood. There is a specific receptor called SHBG-R that is on the membranes of the sex steroid-responsive cells which shows how it affects androgens and estradiol.

Usually, proteins are dissolved in plasma and globulin is one of them. The protein serum consists of the serum protein which is about 6 to 8 g/dl then albumin makes 3.5 to 5.0 g/dl then the rest should be the globulins. The section where globulins fractions are located is made up of proteins, enzymes, and immunoglobulins. Usually, these compounds are arranged in the liver. The only difference would be the immunoglobulins which are arranged in the plasma cells.

These globulins are divided into four sections A1, A2, B, and Y. Certain migratory patterns are created by the levels of anode and cathode. If there is an increase in the globulin fraction it means there is also an increase in the immunoglobulins, but there can also be an increase in other proteins.

If there is a decrease in globulins it can be caused by malnutrition or congenital immune deficiency which can cause a decrease in protein in the kidney.

To see any decrease or increase in the levels of globulin fraction it should be done in the serum electrophoresis and be checked for any certain abnormalities.

Globulins are usually tested through a blood test to see how much protein is in a patient's blood. The blood proteins that should be seen would be globulins and albumin. If a patient's protein level is very low there could be a possibility that the patient may have a liver or kidney disease since globulins are produced in the liver. There are two different types of blood tests. There is the total protein test or the serum protein electrophoresis which measures the level of each protein in a patient's blood. The serum protein electrophoresis test focuses more on the immune system and if it is working properly and it measures the levels of several types of globulins or proteins in the blood.

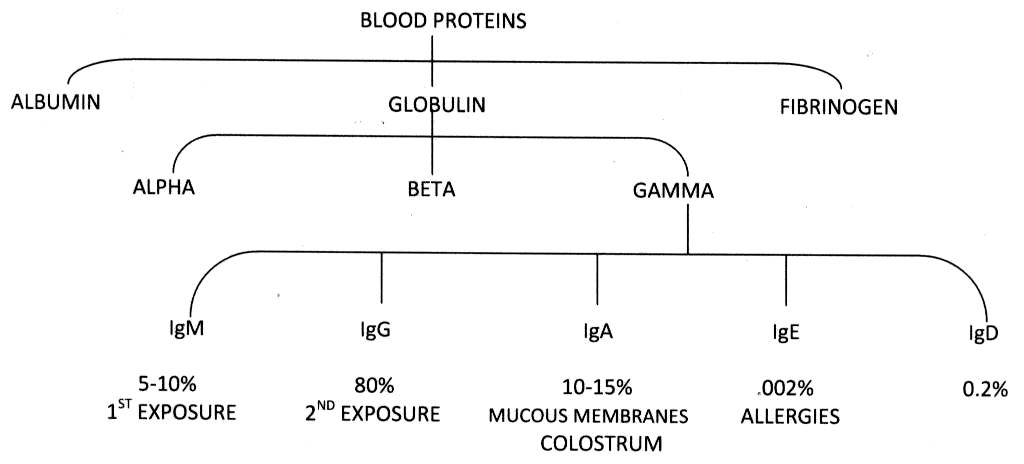
This shows the levels of albumin and the different immunoglobulins

The serum protein electrophoresis test measures the number of proteins in the serum part of a blood sample. The normal ranges to check for the serum globulin would be about 2.0 to 3.5 grams per deciliter then for the immunoglobulins A, M, and G have different ranges. If there are abnormal results then there are different possibilities on what it could mean either there is an acute infection, long-term inflammatory diseases, or Waldenström macroglobulinemia.

Cremeren Globulins exist in various sizes. The lightest globulins are the alpha globulins, which typically have molecular weights of around 93 kDa, while the heaviest class of globulins are the gamma globulins, which typically weigh about 1193 kDa. Being the heaviest, the gamma globulins are among the slowest to segregate in gel electrophoresis.

The immunologically active gamma globulins are also called "immunoglobulins" or "antibodies".

As stated, globulins have different sizes, but the sex hormone-binding globulin has a molecular weight of 90 kDa. In certain subjects the sizes of the sex hormone differed from each other; some globulins had the size of 49 kDa, 52 kDa, and 56 kDa. The subjects with the higher molecular weight that was present showed that the subjects may have a genetic variant of this protein and that it is a heterozygote. This certain variant was discovered in both genders in children along with adults too.

== Human blood plasma levels ==
The normal concentration of globulins in human blood is about 2.3-3.6 g/dL.

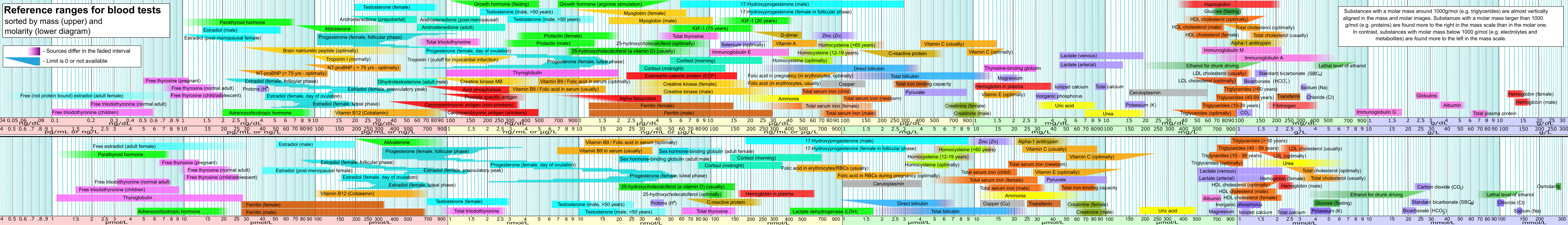
Reference ranges for blood tests, comparing blood content of globulins (shown in purple at right) with other constituents.

== Nonhuman globulins ==
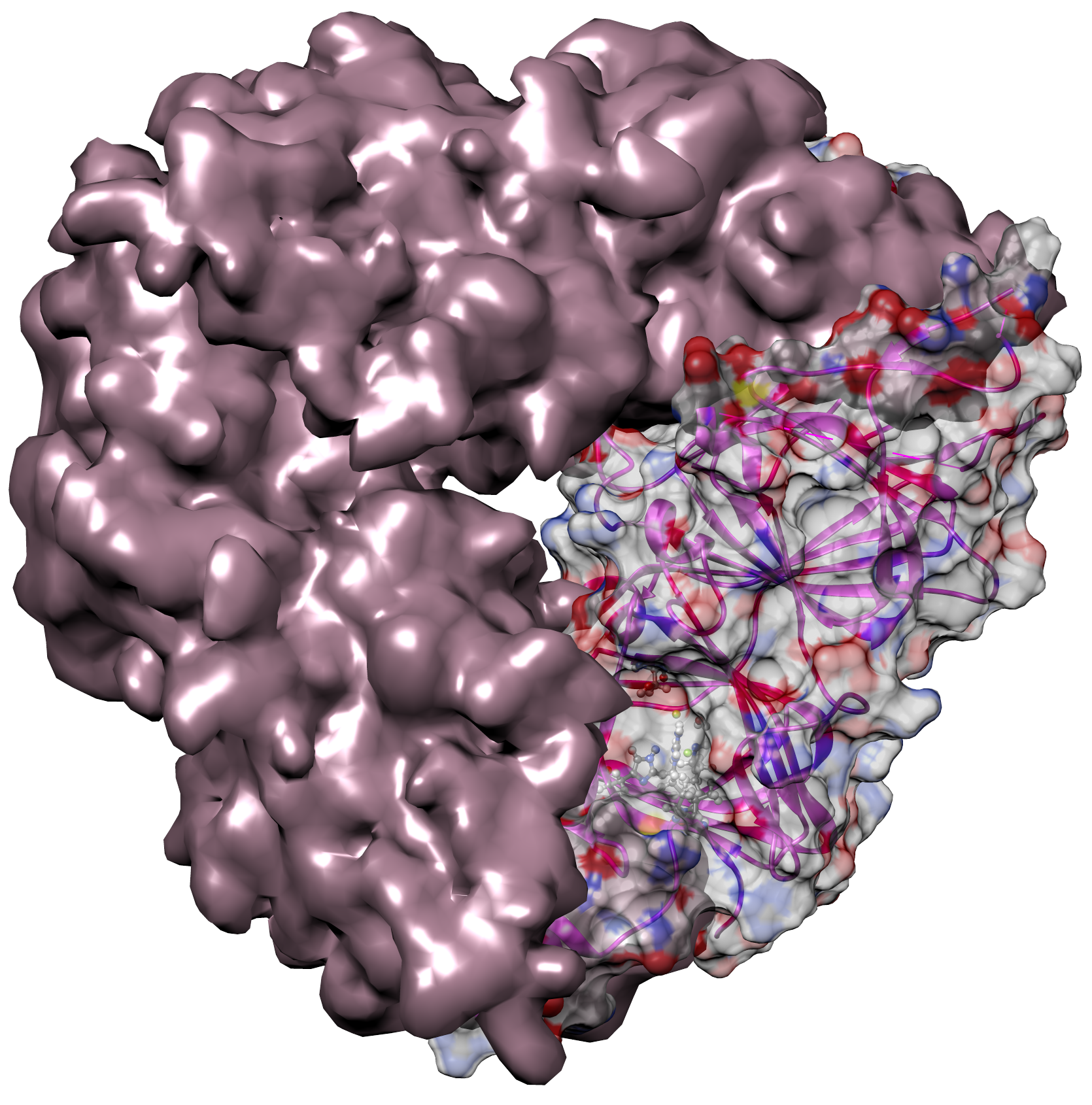
Crystal structure of a pumpkin seed globulin

Globulin proteins exist not only in other animal species, but also in plants. Vicilin and legumin, from peas and other legumes, function as protein storage within seeds. These proteins can cause allergic reactions if they bind with human IgE antibodies.

There have been multiple studies regarding globulins in different species because globulin is a protein that can be found in either plants or animals. These globulins could be found in cereal to legumes, something people can consume every day. Globulin would be a salt-soluble storage protein for plants. These globulins would be in two sections which should be 7S and 11S.

The 7s globulin is in most plant species in a recent study it was discovered that the 7S is not a major seed storage protein as many researchers thought it was, but if not it was found to be a multifunctional protein that has a stress response, a hormone-like receptor and an antibacterial activity.

In the same study, it showed that Bg7S is the protein globulin that is soluble in certain high ionic strength of a salt solution that should have a high isoelectric point as well which should be around 9.05 to 9.26 pI.

This type of globulin is found in many different plants such as tomatoes, corn, wheat, and carrots. There was a genome sequence analysis performed on several plants to see if the gene Bg7S was present in each one and it showed that this gene was present in each plant that was tested meaning that this gene is universal in each plant.

== Pseudoglobulins and euglobulins ==
Pseudoglobulins are a class of globulins that are more soluble in ammonium sulfate than euglobulins. Pseudoglobulins are also soluble in pure water, while euglobulins are not.
