= Duon H. Miller =

American businessman

- Born: 1894
- Died: 1969 (aged 74–75)
- Occupation: Businessman

Duon H. Miller (circa 1894 - 1969) was an American businessman, who founded the cosmetics firm Duon, Inc. Miller was most noteworthy for a sustained campaign against the polio vaccine, which Miller felt was a harmful response to a nonexistent disease.

== Early life ==
Donald H. Miller was born circa 1894. He attended the University of Nebraska, working while studying to pay his tuition, but according to his second wife he dropped out after a year to join the armed forces for World War I. At some point he changed his first name to "Duon."

== Business dealings ==
Miller founded Duon, Inc. in his garage in Dayton, Ohio. The company became a prominent cosmetics manufacturer. Its leading product was "Vita-fluff" shampoo, claimed to be the first cream shampoo. Miller claimed he was a "research chemist," and promoted some of his products as medical treatments. These claims about his Vita-fluff, Lovili, and Glamour products led to a 1943 settlement with the Federal Trade Commission requiring him to drop claims that his products cured medical conditions, and to change the name of his subsidiary company, Northern Research Industries, on the grounds that it was not a research institution. In 1945 the FTC seized a shipment of Vita-fluff on the grounds that it continued to misleadingly claim that it could cure dandruff. A further 1952 action by the FTC enforced action against restraint of trade agreements made by Miller. Miller's second wife asserted to the Dayton Daily News that he had represented himself as a medical doctor, or that he claimed to have attended medical school at Northwestern University and had dropped out there just short of obtaining his MD degree.

== Polio and polio vaccine activism ==
Miller moved to Coral Gables, Florida by the early 1950s and began crusades against soft drinks, sugar and bleached flour. By 1953 Miller was distributing flyers in schools in Key West and claiming that gamma globulin treatments for polio could cause "Negro, Japanese, or other racial characteristics" to appear in descendants of those treated if the treatment had been derived from people of those races. A series of mailings from Miller's organization Polio Prevention, Inc. to Minnesota parents made this statement concerning gamma globulin treatments:

"Just how low can these money-hungry medicos stoop? In their greed for money the plan before a child is born to undermine his health to insure their income permanently. With these damnable cola drinks the 'quacks' have laid a perfect foundation for another child victim of polio (more dollars for the medicos)."

Polio Prevention, Inc. began publishing pamphlets claiming that soft drinks caused polio, Miller claimed that sugar metabolism removed calcium from the body, causing polio. In effect, Miller claimed that polio was sugar-induced calcium deficiency.

Miller was charged in March 1954 with mail fraud, using the mails to send "libelous, scurrilous and defamatory" material by mail. One mailer was headlined " 'Fake' Polio Vaccine May Kill Your Child! !" Another of Miller's mailers claimed that "thousands of little white coffins will be used to bury victims of Salk's heinous and fraudulent vaccine." Found guilty in 1955, Miller was fined $1000. Attempting to circumvent the mails by using other carriers, Miller was charged with violating probation, and was ordered to completely avoid matters concerning polio prevention.

Miller continued his campaigns against sugar, pasteurization and white flours, writing prolifically to newspapers in support of his causes.

== Death ==
Miller died in 1969 at his home in Coral Gables.
