= Alpha-1 antitrypsin deficiency =

- Other names: α1-antitrypsin deficiency
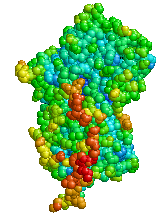
- Structure of alpha-1 antitrypsin
- Specialty: Pulmonology, hepatology, medical genetics
- Symptoms: Shortness of breath, wheezing, yellowish skin
- Complications: COPD, cirrhosis, neonatal jaundice, panniculitis
- Usual onset: 20 to 50 years old
- Causes: Mutation in the SERPINA1 gene
- Risk factors: Northern European and Iberian ancestry
- Diagnostic method: Based on symptoms, blood tests, genetic tests
- Differential diagnosis: Asthma
- Treatment: Medications, lung transplant, liver transplant
- Medication: Bronchodilators, inhaled steroids, antibiotics, intravenous infusions of A1AT protein
- Prognosis: Life expectancy ~50 years (smokers), nearly normal (non-smokers)
- Frequency: 1 in 2,500 (Europeans)

Alpha-1 antitrypsin deficiency (A1AD or AATD) is a genetic disorder that may result in lung disease or liver disease. Onset of lung problems is typically between 20 and 50 years of age. This may result in shortness of breath, wheezing, or an increased risk of lung infections. Complications may include chronic obstructive pulmonary disease (COPD), cirrhosis, neonatal jaundice, or panniculitis.

A1AD is due to a mutation in the SERPINA1 gene that results in not enough alpha-1 antitrypsin (A1AT). Risk factors for lung disease include tobacco smoking and environmental dust. The underlying mechanism involves unblocked neutrophil elastase and buildup of abnormal A1AT in the liver. It is autosomal co-dominant, meaning that one defective allele tends to result in milder deficiency than two defective alleles; for example, carriers with an MS (or SS) allele combination usually produce enough alpha-1 antitrypsin to protect the lungs, while those with MZ alleles have a slightly increased risk of impaired lung or liver function. The diagnosis is suspected based on symptoms and confirmed by blood tests or genetic tests.

Treatment of lung disease may include bronchodilators, inhaled steroids, and, when infections occur, antibiotics. Intravenous infusions of the A1AT protein or in severe disease lung transplantation may also be recommended. In those with severe liver disease liver transplantation may be an option. Avoiding smoking is recommended. Vaccination for influenza, pneumococcus, and hepatitis is also recommended. Life expectancy among those who smoke is 50 years while among those who do not smoke it is almost normal.

The condition affects about 1 in 2,500 people of European descent. Severe deficiency occurs in about 1 in 5,000. In Asians it is uncommon. About 3% of people with COPD are believed to have the condition. Alpha-1 antitrypsin deficiency was first described in the 1960s.

== Signs and symptoms ==
Individuals with A1AD may develop emphysema, or chronic obstructive pulmonary disease during their thirties or forties even without a history of smoking, though smoking greatly increases the risk. Symptoms may include shortness of breath (on exertion and later at rest), wheezing, and sputum production. Symptoms may resemble recurrent respiratory infections or asthma.

A1AD may cause several manifestations associated with liver disease, which include impaired liver function and cirrhosis. In newborns, alpha-1 antitrypsin deficiency can result in early onset jaundice followed by prolonged jaundice. Between 3% and 5% of children with ZZ mutations develop life-threatening liver disease, including liver failure. A1AD is a leading reason for liver transplantation in newborns. In newborns and children, A1AD may cause jaundice, poor feeding, poor weight gain, hepatomegaly and splenomegaly.

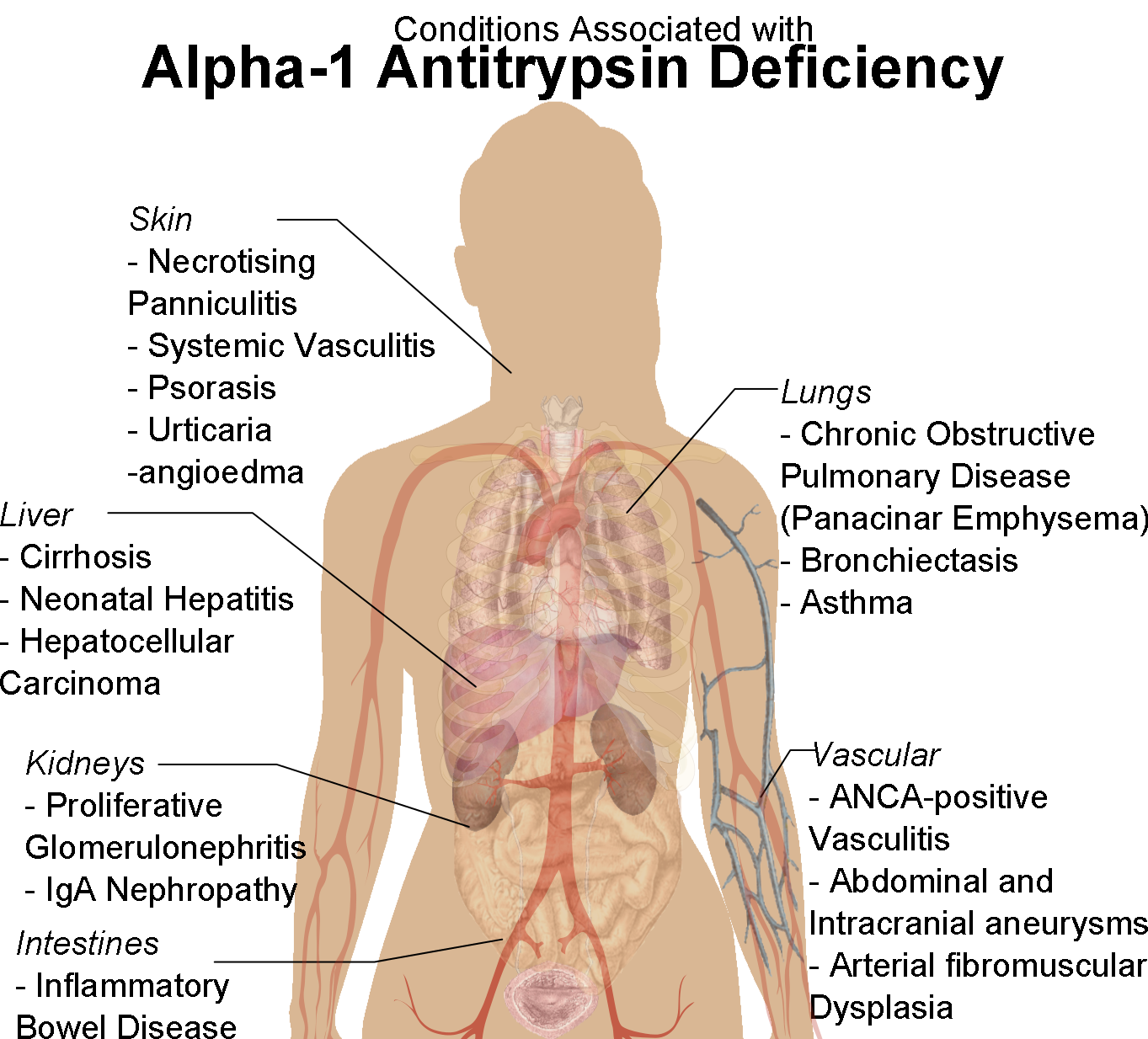
Conditions associated with alpha-1 antitrypsin deficiency, occurring due to paucity of AAT in circulation allowing uninhibited inflammation in lungs, and accumulation of mutated AAT in the liver

Apart from COPD and chronic liver disease, α_{1}-antitrypsin deficiency has been associated with necrotizing panniculitis (a skin condition) and with granulomatosis with polyangiitis in which inflammation of the blood vessels may affect a number of organs but predominantly the lungs and the kidneys.

== Genetics ==
Serpin peptidase inhibitor, clade A, member 1 (SERPINA1) is the gene that encodes the protein alpha-1 antitrypsin. SERPINA1 has been localized to chromosome 14q32. Over 75 mutations of the SERPINA1 gene have been identified, many with clinically significant effects. The most common cause of severe deficiency, PiZ, is a single base-pair substitution leading to a glutamic acid to lysine mutation at position 342 (dbSNP: rs28929474), while PiS is caused by a glutamic acid to valine mutation at position 264 (dbSNP: rs17580). Other rarer forms have been described.

== Pathophysiology ==
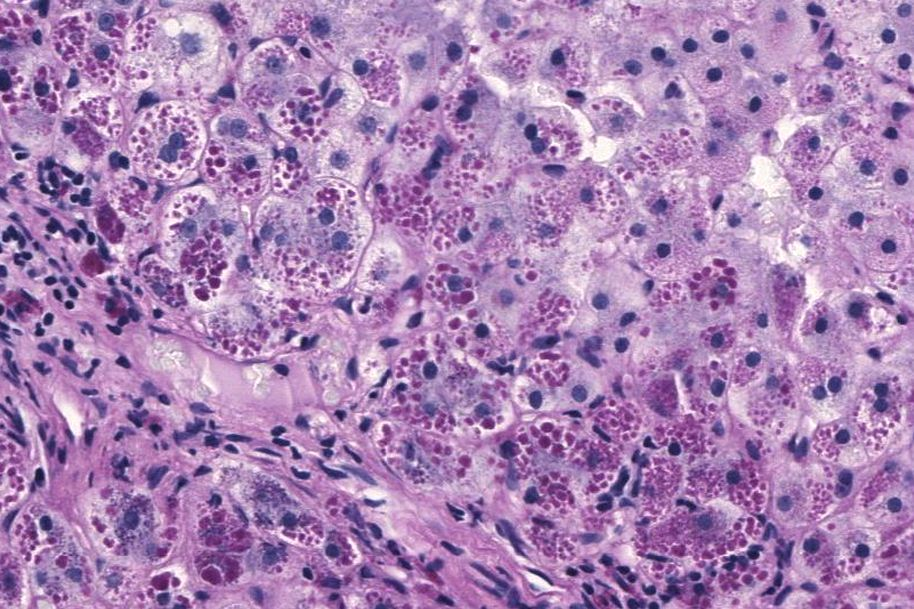
Photomicrograph of a liver biopsy from a patient with alpha-1 antitrypsin deficiency. The PAS with diastase stain shows the diastase-resistant pink globules that are characteristic of this disease.

A1AT is a glycoprotein mainly produced in the liver by hepatocytes, and, in some quantity, by enterocytes, monocytes, and macrophages. In a healthy lung, it functions as an inhibitor against neutrophil elastase, a neutral serine protease that controls lung elastolytic activity which stimulates mucus secretion and CXCL8 release from epithelial cells that perpetuate the inflammatory state. With A1AT deficiency, neutrophil elastase can disrupt elastin and components of the alveolar wall of the lung that may lead to emphysema, and hypersecretion of mucus that can develop into chronic bronchitis. Both conditions are the makeup of chronic obstructive pulmonary disease (COPD).

Normal blood levels of alpha-1 antitrypsin may vary with analytical method but are typically around 1.0-2.7 g/L. In individuals with PiSS, PiMZ and PiSZ genotypes, blood levels of A1AT are reduced to between 40% and 60% of normal levels; this is usually sufficient to protect the lungs from the effects of elastase in people who do not smoke. However, in individuals with the PiZZ genotype, A1AT levels are less than 15% of normal, and they are likely to develop panlobular emphysema at a young age. Cigarette smoke is especially harmful to individuals with A1AD. In addition to increasing the inflammatory reaction in the airways, cigarette smoke directly inactivates alpha-1 antitrypsin by oxidizing essential methionine residues to sulfoxide forms, decreasing the enzyme activity by a factor of 2,000.

With A1AT deficiency, the pathogenesis of the lung disease is different from that of the liver disease, which is caused by the accumulation of abnormal A1AT proteins in the liver, resulting in liver damage. As such, lung disease and liver disease of A1AT deficiency appear unrelated, and the presence of one does not appear to predict the presence of the other. Between 10% and 15% of people with the PiZZ genotype will develop liver fibrosis or liver cirrhosis, because the A1AT is not secreted properly and therefore accumulates in the liver. The mutant Z form of A1AT protein undergoes inefficient protein folding (a physical process where a protein chain achieves its final conformation). 85 percent of the mutant Z form are unable to be secreted and remain in the hepatocyte. Nearly all liver disease caused by A1AT is due to the PiZZ genotype, although other genotypes involving different combinations of mutated alleles (compound heterozygotes) may also result in liver disease. A liver biopsy in such cases will reveal PAS-positive, diastase-resistant inclusions within hepatocytes. Unlike glycogen and other mucins which are diastase sensitive (i.e., diastase treatment disables PAS staining), A1AT deficient hepatocytes will stain with PAS even after diastase treatment - a state thus referred to as "diastase resistant". The accumulation of these inclusions or globules is the main cause of liver injury in A1AT deficiency. However, not all individuals with PiZZ genotype develop liver disease (incomplete penetrance), despite the presence of accumulated mutated protein in the liver. Therefore, additional factors (environmental, genetic, etc.) likely influence whether liver disease develops.

== Diagnosis ==
Emphysema due to alpha-1 antitrypsin deficiency

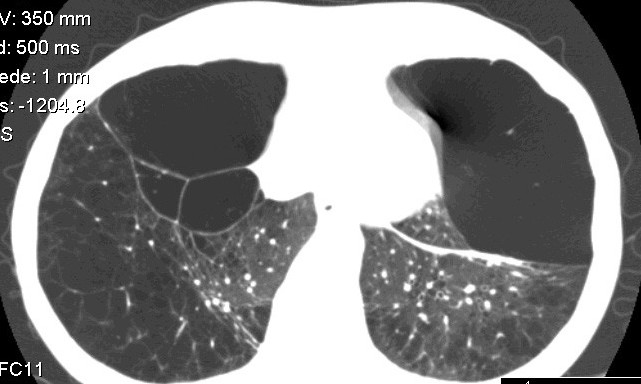
Computed tomography of the lung showing emphysema and bullae in the lower lobes of a subject with type ZZ alpha-1 antitrypsin deficiency. There is also increased lung density in areas with compression of lung tissue by the bullae.

The gold standard of diagnosis for A1AD consists of blood tests to determine the phenotype of the AAT protein or genotype analysis of DNA. Liver biopsy is the gold standard for determining the extent of hepatic fibrosis and assessing for the presence of cirrhosis.

A1AT deficiency remains undiagnosed in many patients. Patients are usually labeled as having COPD without an underlying cause. It is estimated that about 1% of all COPD patients actually have an A1AT deficiency. Testing is recommended in those with COPD, unexplained liver disease, unexplained bronchiectasis, granulomatosis with polyangiitis or necrotizing panniculitis. American guidelines recommend that all people with COPD are tested, whereas British guidelines recommend this only in people who develop COPD at a young age with a limited smoking history or with a family history. The initial test performed is serum A1AT level. A low level of A1AT confirms the diagnosis and further assessment with A1AT protein phenotyping and A1AT genotyping should be carried out subsequently.

As protein electrophoresis does not completely distinguish between A1AT and other minor proteins at the alpha-1 position (agarose gel), antitrypsin can be more directly and specifically measured using a nephelometric or immunoturbidimetric method. Thus, protein electrophoresis is useful for screening and identifying individuals likely to have a deficiency. A1AT is further analyzed by isoelectric focusing (IEF) in the pH range 4.5-5.5, where the protein migrates in a gel according to its isoelectric point or charge in a pH gradient. Normal A1AT is termed M, as it migrates toward the center of such an IEF gel. Other variants are less functional and are termed A-L and N-Z, dependent on whether they run proximal or distal to the M band. The presence of deviant bands on IEF can signify the presence of alpha-1 antitrypsin deficiency. Since the number of identified mutations has exceeded the number of letters in the alphabet, subscripts have been added to most recent discoveries in this area, as in the Pittsburgh mutation described above. As every person has two copies of the A1AT gene, a heterozygote with two different copies of the gene may have two different bands showing on electrofocusing, although a heterozygote with one null mutant that abolishes expression of the gene will only show one band. In blood test results, the IEF results are notated as, e.g., PiMM, where Pi stands for protease inhibitor and "MM" is the banding pattern of that person.

Other detection methods include use of enzyme-linked-immuno-sorbent-assays in vitro and radial immunodiffusion. Alpha-1 antitrypsin levels in the blood depend on the genotype. Some mutant forms fail to fold properly and are, thus, targeted for destruction in the proteasome, whereas others have a tendency to polymerize, thereafter being retained in the endoplasmic reticulum. The serum levels of some of the common genotypes are:

- PiMM: 100% (normal)
- PiMS: 80% of normal serum level of A1AT
- PiSS: 60% of normal serum level of A1AT
- PiMZ: 60% of normal serum level of A1AT
- PiSZ: 40% of normal serum level of A1AT
- PiZZ: 10–15% (severe alpha-1 antitrypsin deficiency)

== Treatment ==
Treatment of lung disease may include bronchodilators, inhaled steroids, and, when infections occur, antibiotics. Intravenous infusions of the A1AT protein or, in severe disease, lung transplantation may also be recommended. In those with severe liver disease liver transplantation may be an option. Avoiding smoking and getting vaccinated for influenza, pneumococcus, and hepatitis is also recommended.

People with lung disease due to A1AD may receive intravenous infusions of alpha-1 antitrypsin, derived from donated human plasma. This augmentation therapy is thought to arrest the course of the disease and halt any further damage to the lungs. Long-term studies of the effectiveness of A1AT replacement therapy are not available. It is currently recommended that patients begin augmentation therapy only after the onset of emphysema symptoms. As of 2015 there were four IV augmentation therapy manufacturers in the United States, Canada, and several European countries. IV therapies are the standard mode of augmentation therapy delivery.

Liver disease due to A1AD does not include any specific treatment, beyond routine care for chronic liver disease. However, the presence of cirrhosis affects treatment in several ways. Individuals with cirrhosis and portal hypertension should avoid contact sports to minimize the risk of splenic injury. All people with A1AD and cirrhosis should be screened for esophageal varices, and should avoid all alcohol consumption. Nonsteroidal antiinflammatory drugs (NSAIDs) should also be avoided, as these medications may worsen liver disease in general, and may particularly accelerate the liver injury associated with A1AD. Augmentation therapy is not appropriate for people with liver disease. If progressive liver failure or decompensated cirrhosis develop, then liver transplantation may be necessary.

Several studies have examined the potential gene therapies to treat A1AD. In March 2025, Beam Therapeutics announced the results of their study using CRISPR-Cas9 to repair the mutated allele; patients who received a single high dose of this treatment had A1AT levels above the threshold considered to be protective against lung disease.

== Epidemiology ==
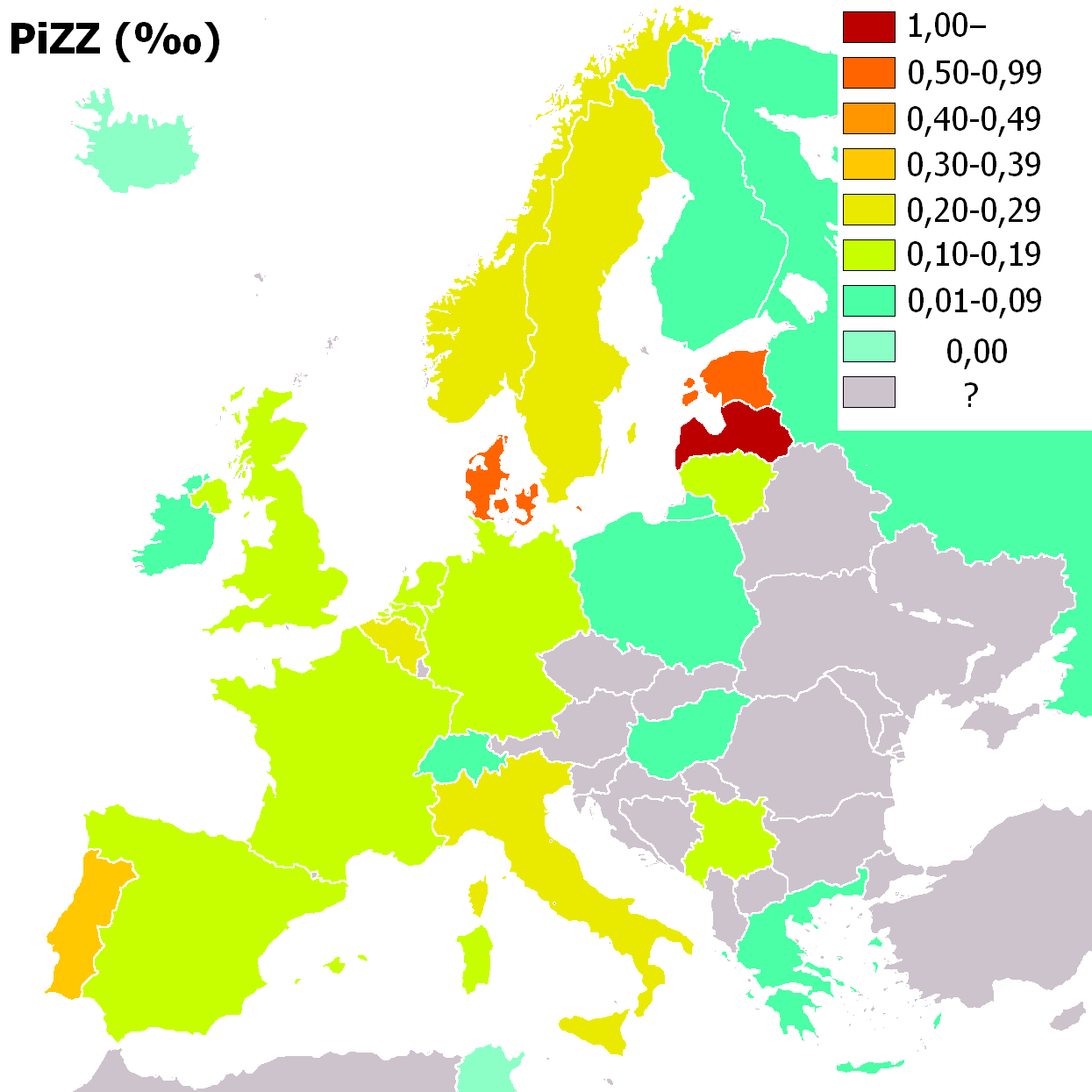
Distribution of PiZZ in Europe

People of Northern European and Iberian ancestry are at the highest risk for A1AD. Four percent of them carry the PiZ allele; between 1 in 625 and 1 in 2000 are homozygous.

Another study detected a frequency of 1 in 1550 individuals. The highest prevalence of the PiZZ variant was recorded in the northern and western European countries with mean gene frequency of 0.0140. Worldwide, an estimated 1.1 million people have A1AT deficiency and roughly 116 million are carriers of mutations.

A1AD is one of the most common genetic diseases worldwide and the second most common metabolic disease affecting the liver.

== History ==
A1AD was discovered in 1963 by Carl-Bertil Laurell at Lund University in Sweden. Laurell, along with a medical resident, Sten Eriksson, made the discovery after noting the absence of the α_{1} band on protein electrophoresis in five of 1500 samples; three of the five patients were found to have developed emphysema at a young age.

The link with liver disease was made six years later, when Harvey Sharp et al. described A1AD in the context of liver disease.

== Research ==
Recombinant and inhaled forms of A1AT treatment are being studied.
