= Alpha 1-antichymotrypsin =

Protein found in humans

SERPINA3
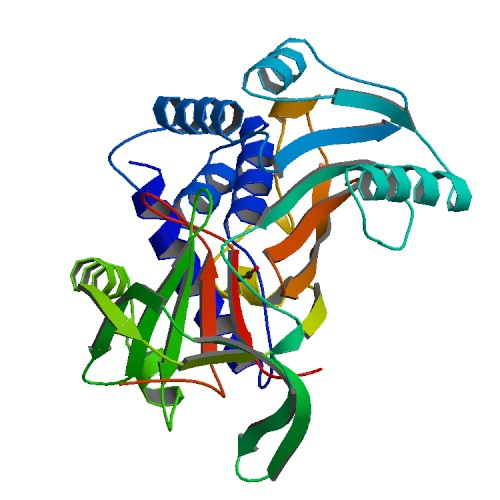

Identifiers
- Aliases: SERPINA3, AACT, ACT, GIG24, GIG25, serpin family A member 3
- External IDs: OMIM: 107280; MGI: 98377; GeneCards: SERPINA3
Available structures
PDB	Ortholog search: PDBe RCSB
PDB	List of PDB id codes 1AS4, 1QMN, 2ACH, 3CAA, 3DLW, 4CAA

Gene location (Human)
Chr.	Chromosome 14 (human)
Band	14q32.13	Start	94,612,384 bp
Band	14q32.13	End	94,624,055 bp

Gene location (Mouse)
Chr.	Chromosome 12 (mouse)
Band	12 E|12 53.99 cM	Start	104,304,745 bp
Band	12 E|12 53.99 cM	End	104,312,403 bp
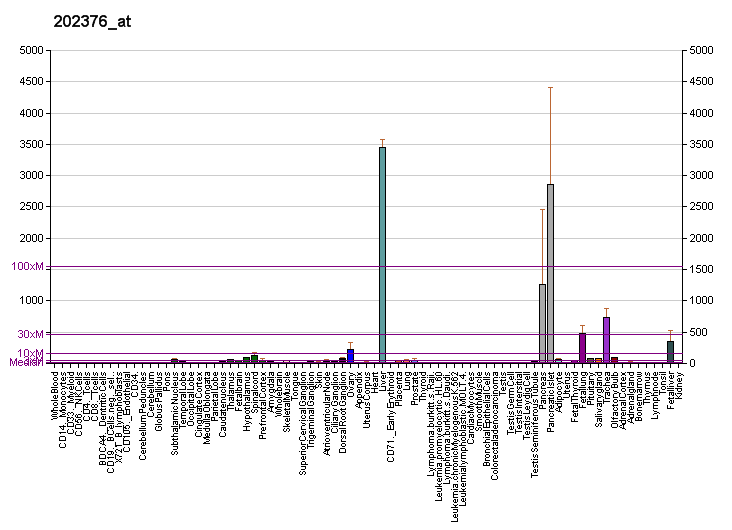
RNA expression pattern
Bgee	Human / Mouse (ortholog); Top expressed in: right lobe of liver; body of pancreas; islet of Langerhans; gastric mucosa; left coronary artery; right coronary artery; gallbladder; left uterine tube; right lung; right ovary / Top expressed in: left lobe of liver; sexually immature organism; pharynx; parotid gland; spinal ganglia; basal plate; medial head of gastrocnemius muscle; adrenal gland; white adipose tissue; duodenum; More reference expression data
BioGPS	More reference expression data
Gene ontology
Molecular function	peptidase inhibitor activity; DNA binding; protein binding; serine-type endopeptidase inhibitor activity
Cellular component	blood microparticle; extracellular exosome; intracellular anatomical structure; nucleus; platelet alpha granule lumen; extracellular region; extracellular space; secretory granule lumen; azurophil granule lumen; collagen-containing extracellular matrix
Biological process	regulation of lipid metabolic process; negative regulation of peptidase activity; inflammatory response; maintenance of gastrointestinal epithelium; acute-phase response; platelet degranulation; negative regulation of endopeptidase activity; neutrophil degranulation
Sources:Amigo / QuickGO
Orthologs
Databases	NCBI: entry; OMA: entry
Species	Human	Mouse
Entrez	12	20714
Ensembl	ENSG00000196136	ENSMUSG00000058207
UniProt	P01011	P07759
RefSeq (mRNA)	NM_001085	NM_011458
RefSeq (protein)	NP_001076	NP_035588
Location (UCSC)	Chr 14: 94.61 – 94.62 Mb	Chr 12: 104.3 – 104.31 Mb
PubMed search
- Wikidata
View/Edit Human	View/Edit Mouse

Alpha 1-antichymotrypsin (symbol α_{1}AC, A1AC, or a1ACT) is an alpha globulin glycoprotein that is a member of the serpin superfamily. In humans, it is encoded by the SERPINA3 gene.

== Function ==
Alpha 1-antichymotrypsin inhibits the activity of certain enzymes called proteases, such as cathepsin G that is found in neutrophils, and chymases found in mast cells, by cleaving them into a different shape or conformation. This activity protects some tissues, such as the lower respiratory tract, from damage caused by proteolytic enzymes.

This protein is produced in the liver, and is an acute phase protein that is induced during inflammation.

== Clinical significance ==
Deficiency of this protein has been associated with liver disease. Mutations have been identified in patients with Parkinson disease and chronic obstructive pulmonary disease.

Alpha 1-antichymotrypsin is also associated with the pathogenesis of Alzheimer's disease as it enhances the formation of amyloid-fibrils in this disease.

== Interactions ==
Alpha 1-antichymotrypsin has been shown to interact with DNAJC1.

== See also ==
- Alpha-1 antitrypsin, another serpin that is analogous for protecting the body from excessive effects of its own inflammatory proteases
