= Plasma protein =

Proteins present in blood serum

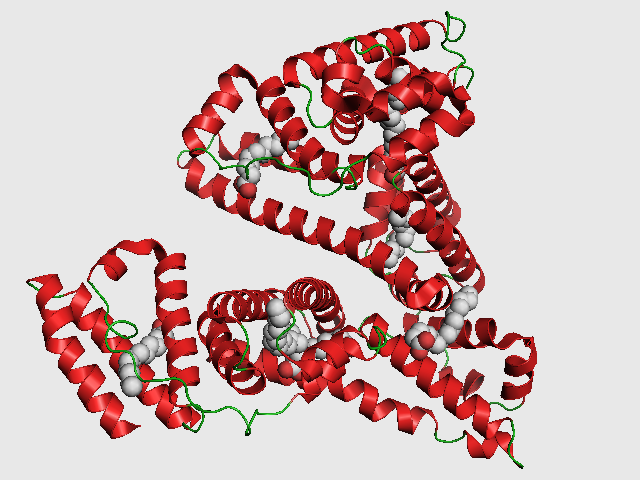
Serum albumin is an example of a plasma protein

Plasma proteins, sometimes referred to as blood proteins, are proteins present in blood plasma. They perform many different functions, including transport of hormones, vitamins and minerals in activity and functioning of the immune system. Other blood proteins act as enzymes, complement, components, protease inhibitors or kinin precursors. Contrary to popular belief, haemoglobin is not a blood protein, as it is carried within red blood cells, rather than in the blood serum.

Serum albumin accounts for 55% of blood proteins, is a major contributor to maintaining the oncotic pressure of plasma and assists, as a carrier, in the transport of lipids and steroid hormones. Globulins make up 38% of blood proteins and transport ions, hormones, and lipids assisting in immune function. Fibrinogen comprises 7% of blood proteins; conversion of fibrinogen to insoluble fibrin is essential for blood clotting. The remainder of the plasma proteins (1%) are regulatory proteins, such as enzymes, proenzymes, and hormones. All blood proteins are synthesized in liver except for the gamma globulins.

== Families of blood proteins ==
Blood protein	Normal level	%	Function
Albumins	3.5–5.0 g/dl	55%	create and maintain osmotic pressure; transport insoluble molecules
Globulins	2.0–2.5 g/dl	38%	participate in immune system
Fibrinogen	0.2–0.45 g/dl	7%	Blood coagulation
Regulatory proteins		<1%	Regulation of gene expression
Clotting factors		<1%	Conversion of fibrinogen into fibrin

Examples of specific blood proteins:

- Prealbumin (transthyretin)
- Alpha 1 antitrypsin (neutralizes trypsin that has leaked from the digestive system)
- Alpha-1-acid glycoprotein
- Alpha-1-fetoprotein
- alpha2-macroglobulin
- Gamma globulins
- Beta-2 microglobulin
- Haptoglobin
- Human Serum Albumin
- Ceruloplasmin
- Complement component 3
- Complement component 4
- C-reactive protein (CRP)
- Lipoproteins (chylomicrons, VLDL, LDL, HDL)
- Transferrin
- Prothrombin
- MBL or MBP

== Clinical significance ==
Separating serum proteins by electrophoresis is a valuable diagnostic tool, as well as a way to monitor clinical progress. Current research regarding blood plasma proteins is centered on performing proteomics analyses of serum/plasma in the search for biomarkers. These efforts started with two-dimensional gel electrophoresis efforts in the 1970s, and in more recent times this research has been performed using LC-tandem MS based proteomics. The normal laboratory value of serum total protein is around 7 g/dL.

Scientists are able to identify blood proteins using Photo-affinity labeling, a means of using photo-reactive ligands as a labeling agent to identify targeted proteins.
