= DNAJC1 =

Protein-coding gene in the species Homo sapiens

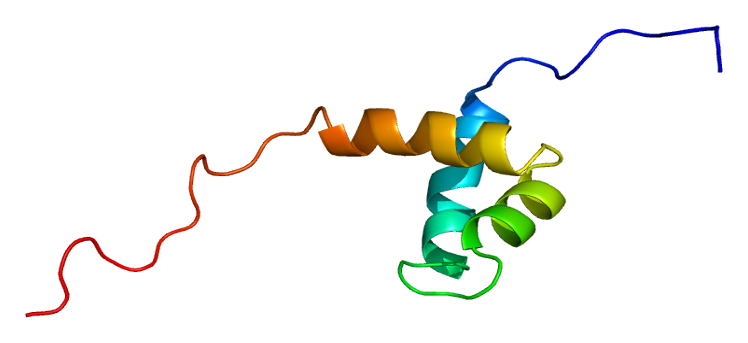

Identifiers
- Aliases: DNAJC1, DNAJL1, ERdj1, HTJ1, MTJ1, DnaJ heat shock protein family (Hsp40) member C1
- External IDs: OMIM: 611207; MGI: 103268; GeneCards: DNAJC1
Available structures
PDB	Ortholog search: PDBe RCSB
PDB	List of PDB id codes 2CQQ, 2CQR

Gene location (Human)
Chr.	Chromosome 10 (human)
Band	10p12.31	Start	21,756,548 bp
Band	10p12.31	End	22,003,769 bp

Gene location (Mouse)
Chr.	Chromosome 2 (mouse)
Band	2|2 A3	Start	18,200,465 bp
Band	2|2 A3	End	18,397,641 bp
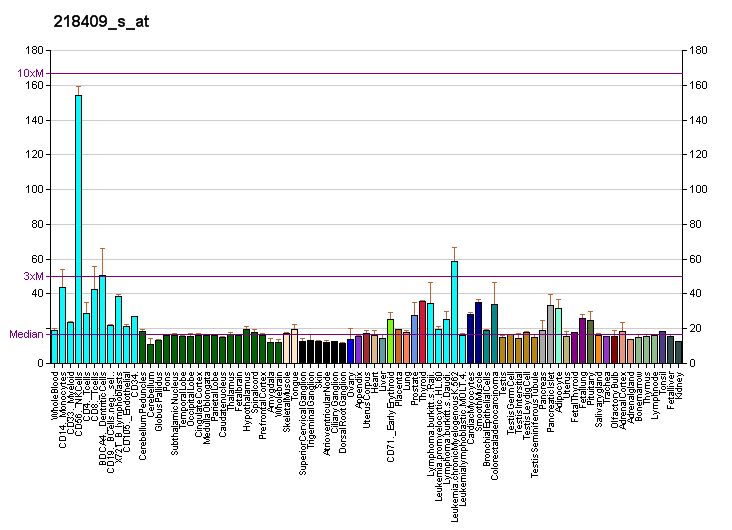
RNA expression pattern
Bgee	Human / Mouse (ortholog); Top expressed in: secondary oocyte; pylorus; cardia; parotid gland; lower lobe of lung; lactiferous duct; pericardium; renal medulla; mucosa of paranasal sinus; tibia / Top expressed in: lacrimal gland; parotid gland; seminal vesicula; external carotid artery; internal carotid artery; prostate; lobe of prostate; Rostral migratory stream; body of femur; decidua; More reference expression data
BioGPS	More reference expression data
Gene ontology
Molecular function	DNA binding; ATPase activator activity; chaperone binding; protein binding; DNA-binding transcription factor activity, RNA polymerase II-specific
Cellular component	integral component of membrane; organelle membrane; plasma membrane; nuclear membrane; endoplasmic reticulum membrane; endoplasmic reticulum; membrane; nucleus; intracellular membrane-bounded organelle
Biological process	negative regulation of proteolysis; protein folding; regulation of translation; regulation of protein secretion; positive regulation of ATP-dependent activity; regulation of transcription by RNA polymerase II
Sources:Amigo / QuickGO
Orthologs
Databases	NCBI: entry; OMA: entry
Species	Human	Mouse
Entrez	64215	13418
Ensembl	ENSG00000136770	ENSMUSG00000026740
UniProt	Q96KC8	Q61712
RefSeq (mRNA)	NM_022365	NM_001190817; NM_007869
RefSeq (protein)	NP_071760	NP_001177746; NP_031895
Location (UCSC)	Chr 10: 21.76 – 22 Mb	Chr 2: 18.2 – 18.4 Mb
PubMed search
- Wikidata
View/Edit Human	View/Edit Mouse

DnaJ homolog subfamily C member 1 is a protein that in humans is encoded by the DNAJC1 gene.

== Interactions ==
DNAJC1 has been shown to interact with Alpha 1-antichymotrypsin.
