= Alpha-1 antitrypsin =

Mammalian protein found in humans

SERPINA1
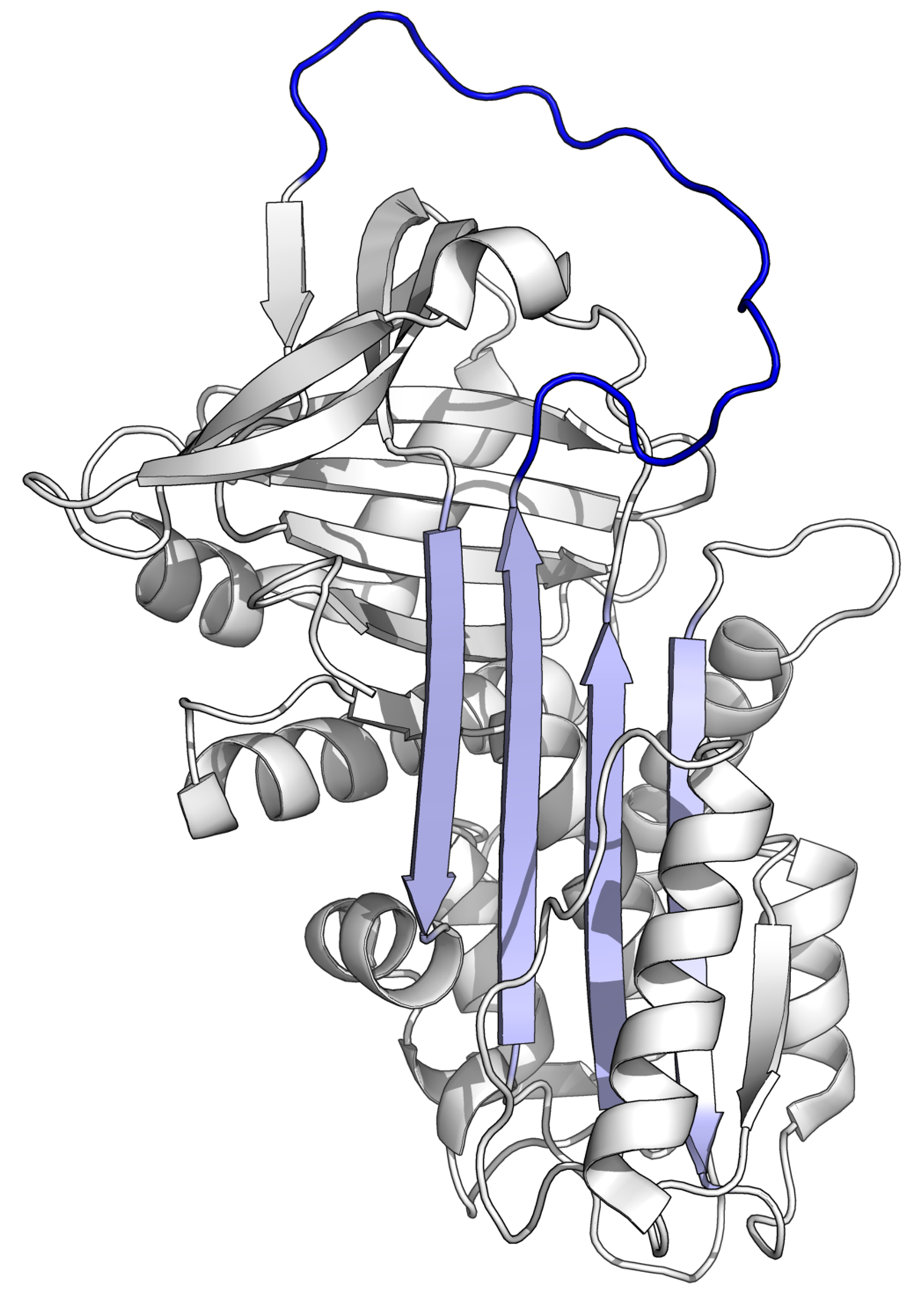

Identifiers
- Aliases: SERPINA1, A1A, A1AT, AAT, PI, PI1, PRO2275, alpha1AT, serpin family A member 1, nNIF
- External IDs: OMIM: 107400; MGI: 891968; GeneCards: SERPINA1
Available structures
PDB	Ortholog search: PDBe RCSB
PDB	List of PDB id codes 1ATU, 1D5S, 1EZX, 1HP7, 1IZ2, 1KCT, 1OO8, 1OPH, 1PSI, 1QLP, 1QMB, 2D26, 2QUG, 3CWL, 3CWM, 3DRM, 3DRU, 3NDD, 3NDF, 3NE4, 3T1P, 7API, 8API, 9API, 4PYW, 5IO1

Gene location (Human)
Chr.	Chromosome 14 (human)
Band	14q32.13	Start	94,376,747 bp
Band	14q32.13	End	94,390,693 bp

Gene location (Mouse)
Chr.	Chromosome 12 (mouse)
Band	12 E|12 52.98 cM	Start	103,729,853 bp
Band	12 E|12 52.98 cM	End	103,739,851 bp
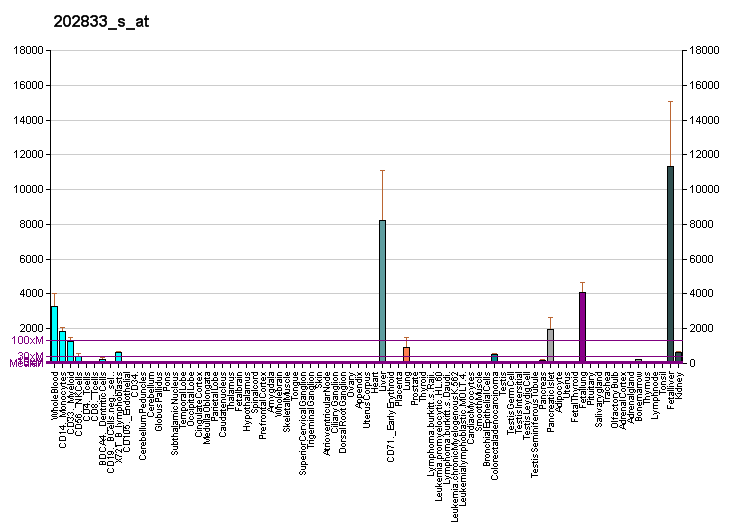

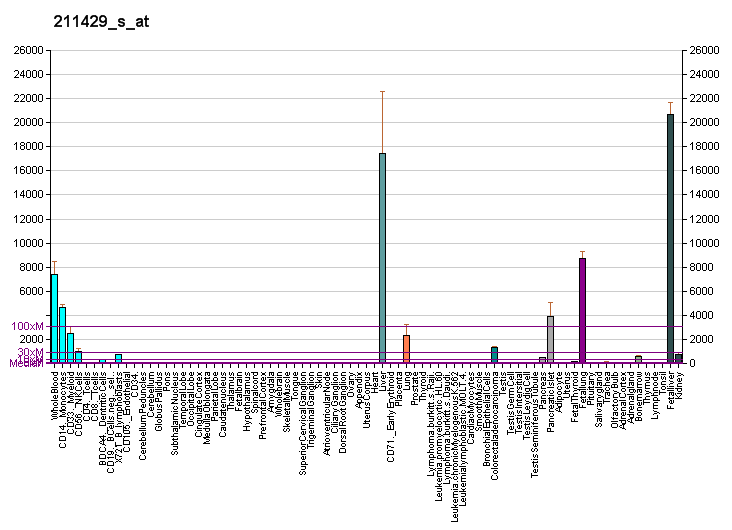
RNA expression pattern
Bgee	Human / Mouse (ortholog); Top expressed in: right lobe of liver; blood; islet of Langerhans; monocyte; granulocyte; gallbladder; duodenum; human kidney; upper lobe of left lung; appendix / Top expressed in: proximal tubule; hepatobiliary system; liver; right kidney; human kidney; Hindgut; lobe of liver; yolk sac; midgut; islet of Langerhans; More reference expression data
BioGPS	More reference expression data
Gene ontology
Molecular function	peptidase inhibitor activity; protease binding; protein binding; identical protein binding; serine-type endopeptidase inhibitor activity
Cellular component	Golgi apparatus; endoplasmic reticulum lumen; COPII-coated ER to Golgi transport vesicle; extracellular exosome; endoplasmic reticulum-Golgi intermediate compartment membrane; platelet alpha granule lumen; extracellular region; endoplasmic reticulum; Golgi membrane; extracellular space; intracellular membrane-bounded organelle; ficolin-1-rich granule lumen; collagen-containing extracellular matrix
Biological process	hemostasis; negative regulation of peptidase activity; platelet degranulation; endoplasmic reticulum to Golgi vesicle-mediated transport; COPII vesicle coating; acute-phase response; negative regulation of endopeptidase activity; blood coagulation; neutrophil degranulation; post-translational protein modification
Sources:Amigo / QuickGO
Orthologs
Databases	NCBI: entry; OMA: entry
Species	Human	Mouse
Entrez	5265	20703
Ensembl	ENSG00000197249; ENSG00000277377	ENSMUSG00000071177
UniProt	P01009	Q00897; P07758
RefSeq (mRNA)	NM_001127707; NM_000295; NM_001002235; NM_001002236; NM_001127700 NM_001127701; NM_001127702; NM_001127703; NM_001127704; NM_001127705; NM_001127706	NM_009246
RefSeq (protein)	NP_000286; NP_001002235; NP_001002236; NP_001121172; NP_001121173 NP_001121174; NP_001121175; NP_001121176; NP_001121177; NP_001121178; NP_001121179	NP_033272; NP_001239498; NP_033269
Location (UCSC)	Chr 14: 94.38 – 94.39 Mb	Chr 12: 103.73 – 103.74 Mb
PubMed search
- Wikidata
View/Edit Human	View/Edit Mouse

Alpha-1 antitrypsin or α_{1}-antitrypsin (A1AT, α_{1}AT, A1A, or AAT) is a protein belonging to the serpin superfamily. It is encoded in humans by the SERPINA1 gene. A protease inhibitor, it is also known as alpha_{1}–proteinase inhibitor (A1PI) or alpha_{1}-antiproteinase (A1AP) because it inhibits various proteases (not just trypsin). As a type of enzyme inhibitor, it protects tissues from enzymes of inflammatory cells, especially neutrophil elastase.

When the blood contains inadequate or defective A1AT (as in alpha-1 antitrypsin deficiency), neutrophil elastase can excessively break down elastin, leading to the loss of elasticity in the lungs. This results in respiratory issues, such as chronic obstructive pulmonary disease, in adults. Normally, A1AT is produced in the liver and enters the systemic circulation. However, defective A1AT may accumulate in the liver, potentially causing cirrhosis in both adults and children.

A1AT not only binds to neutrophil elastase from inflammatory cells but also to elastase on the cell surface. In this latter role, elastase acts as a signaling molecule for cell movement, rather than as an enzyme. Besides liver cells, A1PI is also produced in bone marrow, lymphoid tissue, and the Paneth cells of the gut.

Inactivation of A1AT by other enzymes during inflammation or infection can halt T cell migration precisely at the site of the pathological insult. This suggests that α1PI plays a key role in lymphocyte movement and immune surveillance, particularly in response to infection. A1AT is both an endogenous protease inhibitor and an exogenous one used as medication. The pharmaceutical form is purified from human donor blood and is sold under the nonproprietary name alpha_{1}–proteinase inhibitor (human) and under various trade names (including Aralast NP, Glassia, Prolastin, Prolastin-C, and Zemaira). Recombinant versions are also available but are currently used in medical research more than as medication.

== Nomenclature ==
The protein was initially named "antitrypsin" because of its ability to bind and irreversibly inactivate the enzyme trypsin in vitro covalently. Trypsin, a type of peptidase, is a digestive enzyme active in the duodenum and elsewhere. In older biomedical literature it was sometimes called serum trypsin inhibitor (STI, dated terminology), because its capability as a trypsin inhibitor was a salient feature of its early study.

The term alpha-1 refers to the protein's behavior on protein electrophoresis. On electrophoresis, the protein component of the blood is separated by electric current. There are several clusters, the first being albumin, the second being the alpha, the third beta and the fourth gamma (immunoglobulins). The non-albumin proteins are referred to as globulins.

The alpha region can be further divided into two sub-regions, termed "1" and "2". Alpha-1 antitrypsin is the main protein of the alpha-globulin 1 region.

Another name used is alpha-1 proteinase inhibitor (α_{1}-PI).

== Genetics ==
The gene is located on the long arm of chromosome 14 (14q32.1).

Over 100 different variants of α_{1}-antitrypsin have been described in various populations. North-Western Europeans are most at risk for carrying one of the most common mutant forms of A1AT, the Z mutation (Glu342Lys on M1A, rs28929474).

== Structure ==
A1AT is a single-chain glycoprotein consisting of 394 amino acids in the mature form and exhibits many glycoforms. The three N-linked glycosylations sites are mainly equipped with so-called diantennary N-glycans. However, one particular site shows a considerable amount of heterogeneity since tri- and even tetraantennary N-glycans can be attached to the Asparagine 107 (UniProtKB amino acid nomenclature). These glycans carry different amounts of negatively charged sialic acids; this causes the heterogeneity observed on normal A1AT when analysed by isoelectric focusing. Also, the fucosylated triantennary N-glycans were shown to have the fucose as part of a so-called Sialyl Lewis x epitope, which could confer this protein particular protein-cell recognition properties. The single cysteine residue of A1AT in position 256 (UniProtKB nomenclature) is found to be covalently linked to a free single cysteine by a disulfide bridge.

== Function ==
A1AT is a 52-kDa serpin and, in medicine, it is considered the most prominent serpin; the terms α1-antitrypsin and protease inhibitor (P_{i}) are often used interchangeably.

Most serpins inactivate enzymes by binding to them covalently. These enzymes are released locally in relatively low concentrations where they are immediately cleared by proteins such as A1AT. In the acute phase reaction, a further elevation is required to "limit" the damage caused by activated neutrophil granulocytes and their enzyme elastase, which breaks down the connective tissue fiber elastin.

Besides limiting elastase activity to limit tissue degradation, A1PI also acts to induce locomotion of lymphocytes through tissue including immature T cells through the thymus where immature T cells mature to become immunocompetent T cells that are released into tissue to elevate immune responsiveness.

Like all serine protease inhibitors, A1AT has a characteristic secondary structure of beta sheets and alpha helices. Mutations in these areas can lead to non-functional proteins that can polymerise and accumulate in the liver (infantile hepatic cirrhosis).

== Clinical significance ==
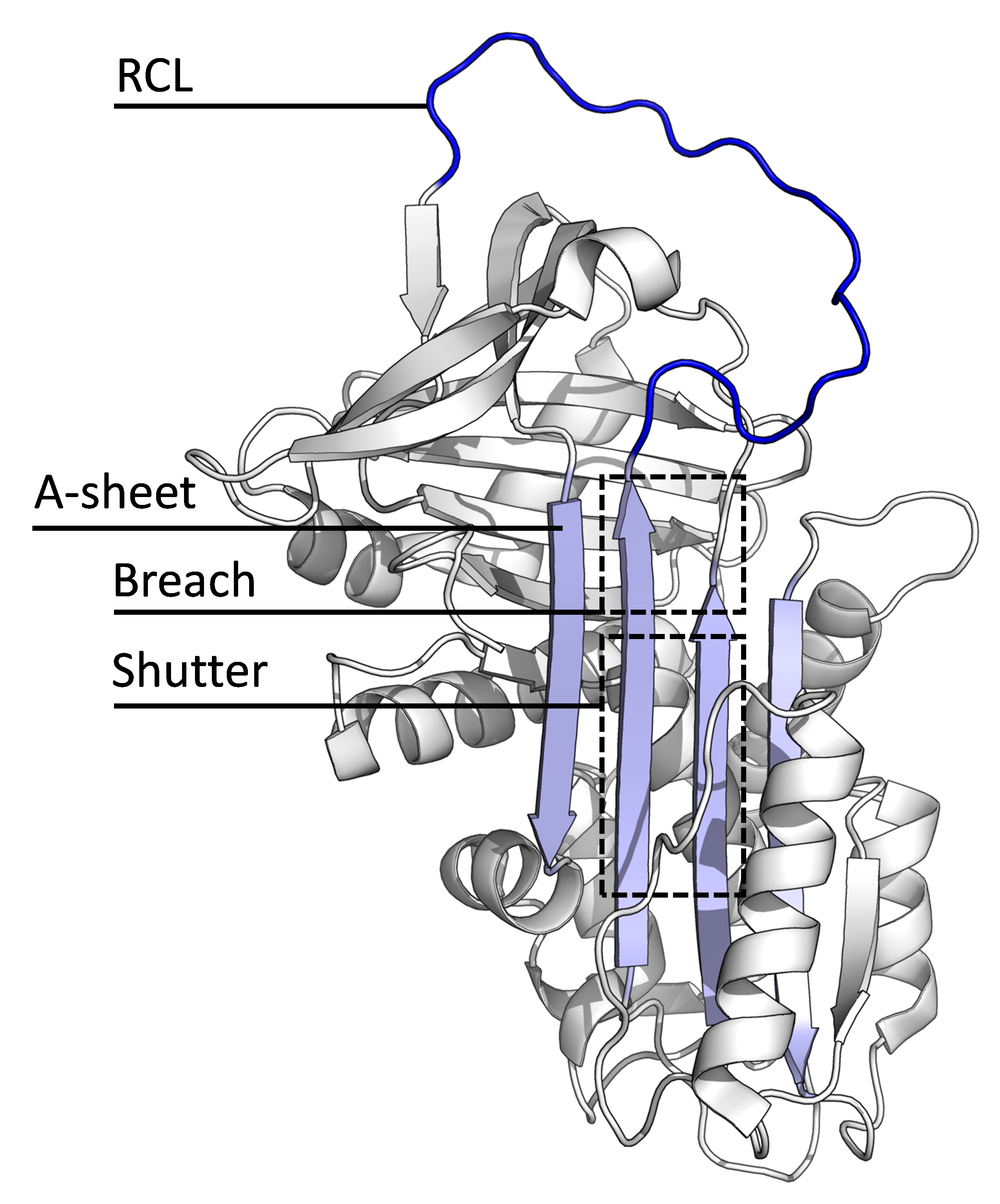
Alpha-1 antitrypsin (white) with highlighted 'reactive centre loop' (blue) and A-sheet (light blue). (PDB: 1QLP)

Disorders of this protein include alpha-1 antitrypsin deficiency, an autosomal co-dominant hereditary disorder in which a deficiency of alpha-1 antitrypsin leads to a chronic uninhibited tissue breakdown. This causes the degradation especially of lung tissue and eventually leads to characteristic manifestations of pulmonary emphysema. Evidence has shown that cigarette smoke can result in oxidation of methionine 358 of α_{1}-antitrypsin (382 in the pre-processed form containing the 24 amino acid signal peptide), a residue essential for binding elastase; this is thought to be one of the primary mechanisms by which cigarette smoking (or second-hand smoke) can lead to emphysema. Because A1AT is expressed in the liver, certain mutations in the gene encoding the protein can cause misfolding and impaired secretion, which can lead to liver cirrhosis.

An extremely rare form of P_{i}, termed P_{i}_{Pittsburgh}, functions as an antithrombin (a related serpin), due to a mutation (Met358Arg). One person with this mutation has been reported to have died of a bleeding diathesis.

A liver biopsy will show abundant PAS-positive globules within periportal hepatocytes.

Patients with rheumatoid arthritis (RA) have been found to make autoantibodies toward the carbamylated form of A1AT in the synovial fluid. This suggests that A1AT may play an anti-inflammatory or tissue-protecting role outside the lungs. These antibodies are associated with a more severe disease course, can be observed years before disease onset, and may predict the development of RA in arthralgia patients. Consequently, carbamylated A1AT is currently being developed as an antigenic biomarker for RA.

== Analysis ==
Updated methods for analysis of A1AT have been described in extensive detail in Alpha-1 Antitrypsin. Methods in Molecular Biology. Edited by Cynthia L. Bristow. New York: Humana, 2023. doi:https://doi.org/10.1007/978-1-0716-3605-3.

A1AT has a reference range in blood of 0.9–2.3 g/L (in the US the reference range is expressed as mg/dL or micromoles), but the concentration can rise manyfold upon acute inflammation.

The level of A1AT in serum is most often determined by adding an antibody that binds to A1AT, then using turbidimetry to measure how much A1AT is present. Other detection methods include the use of enzyme-linked-immuno-sorbent-assays and radial immunodiffusion.

Different analytical methods are used to determine A1AT phenotype. As protein electrophoresis is imprecise, the A1AT phenotype is analysed by isoelectric focusing (IEF) in the pH range 4.5–5.5, where the protein migrates in a gel according to its isoelectric point or charge in a pH gradient.

Normal A1AT is termed M, as it migrates toward the center of such an IEF gel. Other variants are less functional and are termed A-L and N-Z, dependent on whether they run proximal or distal to the M band. The presence of deviant bands on IEF can signify the presence of alpha-1 antitrypsin deficiency. Since the number of identified mutations has exceeded the number of letters in the alphabet, subscripts have been added to most recent discoveries in this area, as in the Pittsburgh mutation described above.

As every person has two copies of the A1AT gene, a heterozygote with two different copies of the gene may have two different bands showing on electrofocusing, although heterozygote with one null mutant that abolishes expression of the gene will only show one band.

In blood test results, the IEF results are notated as in P_{i}MM, where P_{i} stands for protease inhibitor and "MM" is the banding pattern of that patient.

Alpha-1 antitrypsin levels in the blood depend on the genotype. Some mutant forms fail to fold properly and are, thus, targeted for destruction in the proteasome, whereas others have a tendency to polymerise, being retained in the endoplasmic reticulum. The serum levels of some of the common genotypes are:

- PiMM: 100% (normal)
- PiMS: 80% of normal serum level of A1AT
- PiSS: 60% of normal serum level of A1AT
- PiMZ: 60% of normal serum level of A1AT
- PiSZ: 40% of normal serum level of A1AT
- PiZZ: 10-15% (severe alpha-1 antitrypsin deficiency)
- PiZ is caused by a glutamate to lysine mutation at position 342 (366 in pre-processed form)
- PiS is caused by a glutamate to valine mutation at position 264 (288 in pre-processed form)

Other rarer forms have been described; in all, there are over 80 variants.

== Medical uses ==
Alpha-1 antitrypsin
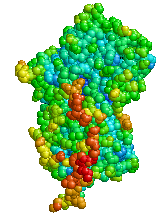

Clinical data
- Trade names: Aralast, Zemaira, Glassia, others
- AHFS/Drugs.com: Monograph
- License data: US DailyMed: Alpha 1 proteinase inhibitor
- Routes of administration: Intravenous
- ATC code: B02AB02 (WHO)

Legal status
- Legal status: AU: S4 (Prescription only); CA: ℞-only / Schedule D; UK: POM (Prescription only); US: ℞-only; EU: Rx-only; In general: ℞ (Prescription only)

Identifiers
- IUPAC name: Alpha-1-proteinase inhibitor
- CAS Number: 9041-92-3
- DrugBank: DB00058
- ChemSpider: none
- UNII: F43I396OIS
- ChEMBL: ChEMBL4297879
- PDB ligand: KB2 (PDBe, RCSB PDB)
- CompTox Dashboard (EPA): DTXSID2040810
- ECHA InfoCard: 100.029.919

Chemical and physical data
- Formula: C_{2001}H_{3130}N_{514}O_{601}S_{10}
- Molar mass: 44324.65 g·mol^{−1}

Alpha-1 antitrypsin concentrates are prepared from the blood plasma of blood donors. The US Food and Drug Administration (FDA) has approved the use of four alpha-1 antitrypsin products derived from a human plasma: Prolastin, Zemaira, Glassia, and Aralast. These products for intravenous augmentation A1AT therapy can cost up to $100,000 per year per patient. They are administered intravenously at a dose of 60 mg/kg once a week; higher doses do not provide additional benefit although they can be used in anticipation of an interruption of weekly administration, such as for a vacation.

Alpha1-proteinase inhibitor (Respreeza) was approved for medical use in the European Union in August 2015. It is indicated for maintenance treatment, to slow the progression of emphysema in adults with documented severe alpha1-proteinase inhibitor deficiency (e.g., genotypes PiZZ, PiZ (null), Pi (null, null), PiSZ). People are to be under optimal pharmacologic and non-pharmacologic treatment and show evidence of progressive lung disease (e.g. lower forced expiratory volume per second (FEV1) predicted, impaired walking capacity or increased number of exacerbations) as evaluated by a healthcare professional experienced in the treatment of alpha1-proteinase inhibitor deficiency.

The most common side effects include dizziness, headache, dyspnoea (shortness of breath) and nausea. Allergic reactions have been observed during treatment, some of which were severe.

Aerosolized-augmented A1AT therapy is under study. This involves inhaling purified human A1AT into the lungs and trapping the A1AT into the lower respiratory tract. However, inhaled A1AT may not reach the elastin fibers in the lung where elastase injury occurs. Further study is currently underway. Recombinant alpha-1 antitrypsin is not yet available for use as a medication but is under development.

== History ==
Axelsson and Laurell first investigated the possibility of allelic variants of A1AT leading to disease in 1965.

== See also ==
- Alpha 1-antichymotrypsin, another serpin that is analogous for protecting the body from excessive effects of its own inflammatory proteases
- Orosomucoid is a related alpha 1 protein
