= Extracellular chaperone =

Type of chaperone protein outside cells

Extracellular chaperone (ECs) are a type of chaperone protein that resides outside of cells in extracellular space such as blood plasma. They are secreted out of cells. Their function is to protect and assist in protein folding for a diverse array of proteins in this space. Their role is vital as proteins in extracellular space can easily aggregate and unfold. Examples of extracellular chaperones include J-domain proteins, Clusterins (CLU), Haptoglobin (HP), α2-macroglobulin (a2m) and many others.

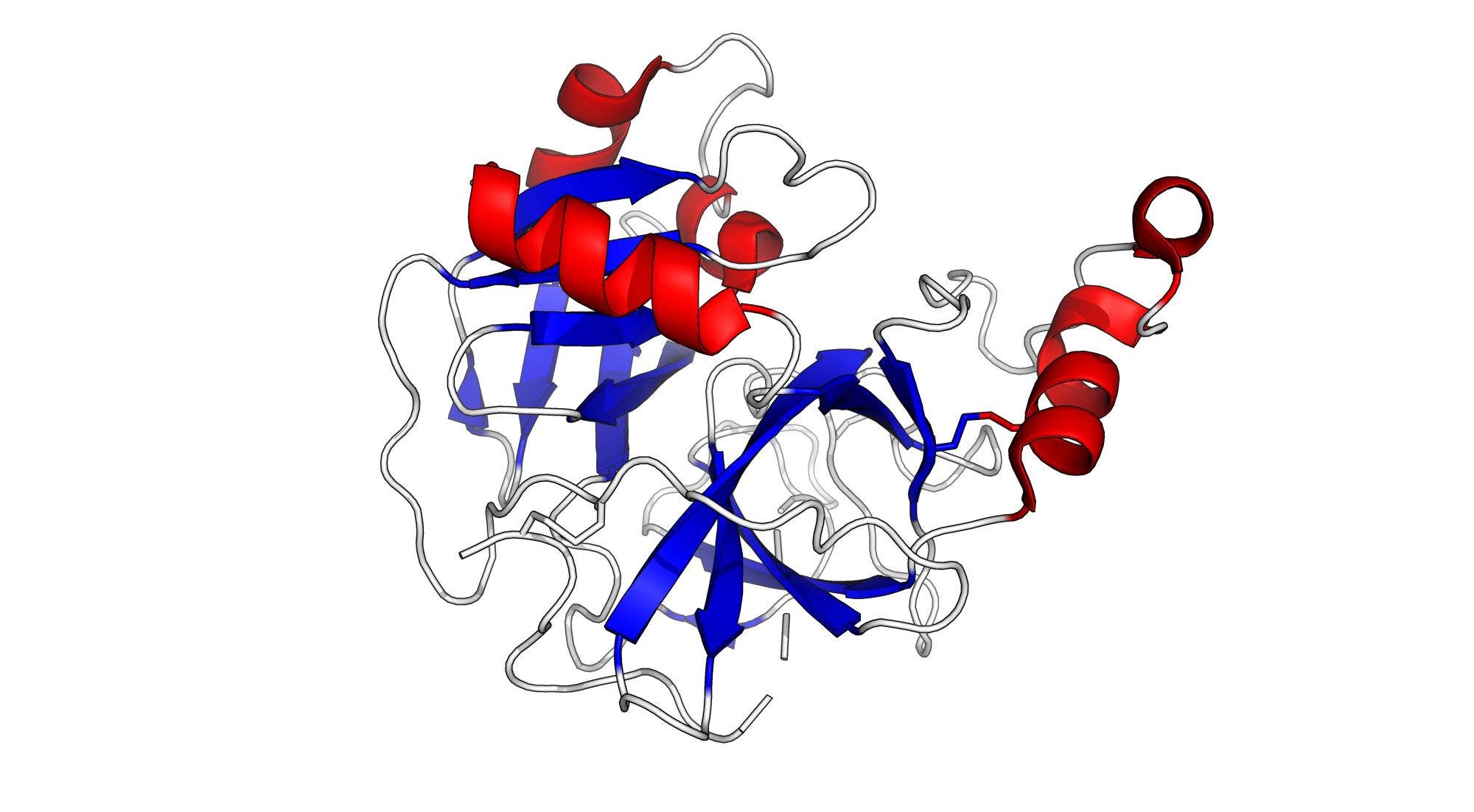
Haptoglobin is an example of an extracellular chaperone protein found in humans.

They can interact with invading pathogens and the immune system response including the complementary pathway. Some extracellular chaperones such as neuroserpin and transthyretin also inhibit amyloid formation which causes many neurodegenerative diseases such as Alzheimers or Parkinson's disease. Because of their role in the cleanup of misfolded and aggregated proteins and their interactions with the immune system, they are valuable in medical research. They can be used to potentially treat neurodegenerative diseases.
