= Orosomucoid =

Acute phase protein found in plasma

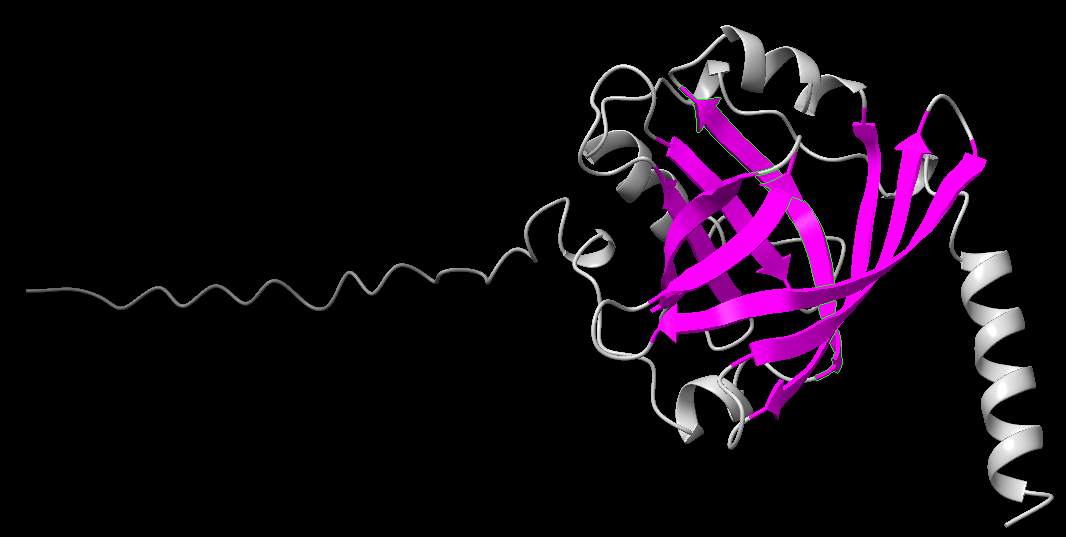
Structure of human alpha-1-acid glycoprotein (AGP1) rendered in ChimeraX using PDB ID: 3KQ0

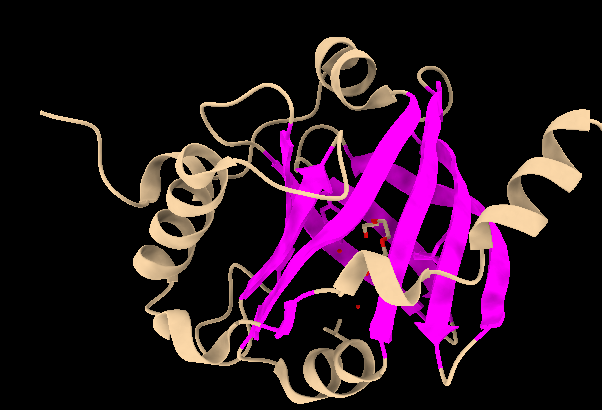
Structure of human alpha-1-acid glycoprotein (AGP2) rendered in ChimeraX using PDB ID: 3APU

Orosomucoid (ORM) or alpha-1-acid glycoprotein (α_{1}AGp, AGP or AAG) is an acute phase protein found in plasma. Orosomucoid was discovered over 70 years ago and belongs to the lipocalin protein family. There are two isoforms of AGP, referred to as AGP1 and AGP2. It is an alpha-globulin glycoprotein and is modulated by two polymorphic genes. It is synthesized primarily in hepatocytes and has a normal plasma concentration between 0.6 and 1.2 mg/mL (1–3% plasma protein). Recent research has shown that under certain physiological conditions, brain and adipose tissue can also synthesize this protein. Plasma levels of AGP are affected by pregnancy, burns, certain drugs, and certain diseases, particularly HIV. APG also plays an important role in inflammation and pharmacokinetics, acting as a major transport protein in the blood stream.

== Structure ==
Orosomucoid is a highly glycosylated protein having a molecular weight of 34–54 kDa, with nearly 45% of its mass in carbohydrate sidechains. The isoforms AGP1 and AGP2 are encoded by the ORM1 and ORM2 genes on chromosome 9, and differ by only 22 amino acids This results in a slightly smaller beta-barrel in AGP2. The structural differences between AGP 1 and 2 allow for Alpha 1-acid glycoprotein to bind to a wider variety of ligands, broadening AGP's functional range. These chains contribute significantly to molecular stability and interaction potential with other molecules, including significant drugs. During systemic inflammation AGP concentration increases and its glycosylation pattern changes, generating various glycoforms with distinct — sometimes even opposing — biological activities. One study shows that at least 5 different functions can be linked to changes in the heteroglycan side chains. These side chain can be bi-, tri-, or tetra antennary, which contribute to the strength of binding to the ligand. It has been proven that during acute inflammation there is an increase of AGP glycoforms with biantennary units, this is a type I glycosylation change. In chronic inflammatory conditions, AGP often exhibits a reduction in glycoforms containing biantennary heteroglycans, this is a type II glycosylation shift. Similar changes in glycosylation patterns have also been observed during pregnancy, estrogen therapy, and liver injury.

The tertiary structure of AGP, determined via X-ray crystallography (PDB ID: 3KQ0), reveals a characteristic beta-barrel fold. Visualization using ChimeraX has provided valuable insights into its conformation and binding pockets.

== Function ==
=== Immunomodulatory role ===
AGP is involved in immune regulation and regulates many inflammation-related processes, including white blood cell activity and pathogen binding. One example of how Human AGP has been shown to regulate immune response is by inhibition of the proliferative response of peripheral blood lymphocytes by phytohemagglutinin (PHA) stimulation. These immunomodulatory effects are reversible and may be due to conformational changes on lymphocyte surfaces or interactions with protein kinases. Overall, AGP is considered protective against the harmful consequences of prolonged inflammation.

A study was conducted to compare the different glycosylation sites from patients with acute versus chronic inflammation. The blood serum of patients with acute inflammation showed an increase in bi-antennary and decrease in tri- and tetra-antennary structures, and an increases in alpha1,3-fucosylation, at most glycosylation sites on AGP. In the blood serum of patients with chronic inflammation, higher concentrations of tri-antennary alpha1,3-fucosylation at sites 3 and 4 and tetra-antennary alpha1,3-fucosylation at sites 3, 4 and 5 were detected. In different pathophysiological state (inflammation, rheumatoid arthritis, cancer) alterations of Asn-linked glycans have been reported.

=== Pharmacokinetics and pharmacodynamics ===
A major established function of ORM is to act as a carrier, especially for basic and neutrally charged lipophilic compounds. In medicine, it is known as the primary carrier of basic (positively charged) drugs (whereas albumin carries acidic (negatively charged) and neutral drugs), steroids, and protease inhibitors. According to Zsila and Iwao, AGP significantly influences the pharmacokinetic affects of many therapeutic drugs due to its strong ligand-binding capabilities. Being an acidic protein, AGP primarily binds to basic (positively charged) drugs, but it can also bind neutral or acidic molecules in some cases. Glycosylation, particularly fucosylation, appears to impact this drug-binding affinity.

Because AGP possesses a chiral and structurally asymmetric binding pocket, it can interact differently with the enantiomers of various drugs. Studies have shown stereoselective binding for several pharmaceuticals, including proton pump inhibitors and the anti-inflammatory drug apremilast. In these cases, AGP forms high-affinity complexes with both enantiomers, but with slight differences in stability and interaction strength, indicating that the protein can discriminate between chiral drug molecules.

A notable example is AGP's high binding affinity for 7-hydroxystaurosporine, an anti-cancer drug. AGP limits the drug's effectiveness in humans but not in rats or cattle. Other drugs with strong AGP binding includes but is not limited to the following: Warfarin, Pinometostat, Aripiprazole, Imatinib, Voriconazole, ONO-2160, Brigatinib.

== Clinical significance ==
AGP's plasma levels vary in different medical conditions. It tends to increase in obstructive jaundice and decrease in hepatocellular jaundice and intestinal infections. It has also been identified as a circulating biomarker useful for estimating the five-year risk of all-cause mortality, along with albumin, VLDL particle size, and citrate.

It has been proven that aging causes a small decrease in plasma albumin levels; but tends to not show any change in alpha-1-acid glycoprotein presents in the blood plasma. The effect of any changes on drug protein binding and drug delivery appear to be minimal. In studies where plasma albumin and alpha-1-acid glycoprotein are monitored for individuals between 20 and 90 years old, there was a significant decrease in the concentrations of albumin while the concentration of AGP largely remained unchanged

AGP shows a complex interaction with thyroid homeostasis: AGP in low concentrations was observed to stimulate the thyrotropin (TSH) receptor and intracellular accumulation of cyclic AMP. High AGP concentrations, however, inhibited TSH signalling. This specific function of AGP still remains largely unknown and under researched.

Alpha-1-acid glycoprotein has been identified as one of four potentially useful circulating biomarkers for estimating the five-year risk of all-cause mortality (the other three are albumin, very low-density lipoprotein particle size, and citrate). Studies have shown that Alpha 1-acid glycoprotein is an independent predictor death while hospitalized. In a study of 433 patients, from ages 73–92, and all admitted in a rehabilitation department for geriatric medicine the study collected base line alpha 1-acid glycoproteins at baseline and then at discharge or death. This study showed that in the population of discharged patients their baseline alpha 1-acid glycoprotein levels where higher than those whose stay ended with death (1691 +/* 69 mg/l versus 1340 +/- 456 mg/l).

== See also ==
- Alpha-1 antitrypsin deficiency
- Alpha-1 antitrypsin
- Cerastocytin - protein of similar structure
