= Carl-Bertil Laurell =

Swedish medical doctor and researcher

Carl-Bertil Laurell

Carl-Bertil Laurell (born 28 June 1919 in Uppsala, died 18 September 2001 in Malmö) was a Swedish medical doctor and researcher. Laurell was Professor of clinical chemistry at Lund University. He named the blood plasma protein transferrin, and discovered that an inherited lack of alpha-1 antitrypsin could lead to emphysema.

In 1976, he was made a member of the Royal Swedish Academy of Sciences.

Laurell received the Nordic Fernström Prize in 1980, and received the Edwin F. Ullman Award from the American Association for Clinical Chemistry on 4 May 2001.

He was married to Anna-Britta Laurell, Professor of immunology at Lund university, from 1946 until her death in 2000. The couple had six children. He died on 18 September 2001.

A street at Skåne University Hospital in Malmö is named after him.
