= Alpha-2-Macroglobulin =

Large plasma protein found in the blood

A2M

Identifiers
- Aliases: A2M, A2MD, CPAMD5, FWP007, S863-7, transcuprein, alpha-2-macroglobulin
- External IDs: OMIM: 103950; MGI: 2449119; GeneCards: A2M
Available structures
PDB	Ortholog search: PDBe RCSB
PDB	List of PDB id codes 4ACQ, 2P9R, 1BV8

Gene location (Human)
Chr.	Chromosome 12 (human)
Band	12p13.31	Start	9,067,664 bp
Band	12p13.31	End	9,116,229 bp

Gene location (Mouse)
Chr.	Chromosome 6 (mouse)
Band	6 F1|6 57.49 cM	Start	121,612,335 bp
Band	6 F1|6 57.49 cM	End	121,656,186 bp
RNA expression pattern
Bgee	Human / Mouse (ortholog); Top expressed in: lower lobe of lung; upper lobe of lung; upper lobe of left lung; right lung; Descending thoracic aorta; visceral pleura; pericardium; tendon of biceps brachii; epithelium of colon; right coronary artery / Top expressed in: gastrula; decidua; corneal stroma; Epithelium of choroid plexus; choroid plexus of fourth ventricle; ciliary body; iris; retinal pigment epithelium; vestibular membrane of cochlear duct; left lung lobe; More reference expression data
BioGPS	n/a
Gene ontology
Molecular function	peptidase inhibitor activity; interleukin-8 binding; growth factor binding; calcium-dependent protein binding; protease binding; protein binding; serine-type endopeptidase inhibitor activity; enzyme binding; tumor necrosis factor binding; endopeptidase inhibitor activity; interleukin-1 binding; signaling receptor binding; GTPase activator activity
Cellular component	cytosol; blood microparticle; extracellular region; extracellular exosome; platelet alpha granule lumen; extracellular space; collagen-containing extracellular matrix
Biological process	blood coagulation, intrinsic pathway; negative regulation of peptidase activity; platelet degranulation; extracellular matrix disassembly; stem cell differentiation; negative regulation of complement activation, lectin pathway; regulation of small GTPase mediated signal transduction; positive regulation of GTPase activity; negative regulation of endopeptidase activity
Sources:Amigo / QuickGO
Orthologs
Databases	NCBI: entry; OMA: entry
Species	Human	Mouse
Entrez	2	232345
Ensembl	ENSG00000175899	ENSMUSG00000030111
UniProt	P01023	Q6GQT1
RefSeq (mRNA)	NM_000014; NM_001347423; NM_001347424; NM_001347425	NM_175628
RefSeq (protein)	NP_000005; NP_001334352; NP_001334353; NP_001334354	NP_783327
Location (UCSC)	Chr 12: 9.07 – 9.12 Mb	Chr 6: 121.61 – 121.66 Mb
PubMed search
- Wikidata
View/Edit Human	View/Edit Mouse

α_{2}-Macroglobulin (α_{2}M) or alpha-2-macroglobulin is a large (720 KDa) plasma protein found in the blood. It is mainly produced by the liver, and also locally synthesized by macrophages, fibroblasts, and adrenocortical cells. In humans it is encoded by the A2M gene.

α_{2}-Macroglobulin acts as an antiprotease and is able to inactivate an enormous variety of proteinases. It functions as an inhibitor of fibrinolysis by inhibiting plasmin and kallikrein. It functions as an inhibitor of coagulation by inhibiting thrombin. α_{2}-macroglobulin may act as a carrier protein because it also binds to numerous growth factors and cytokines, such as platelet-derived growth factor, basic fibroblast growth factor, TGF-β, insulin, and IL-1β.

No specific deficiency with associated disease has been recognized, and no disease state is attributed to low concentrations of α_{2}-macroglobulin. The concentration of α_{2}-macroglobulin rises 10-fold or more in the nephrotic syndrome when other lower molecular weight proteins are lost in the urine. The loss of α_{2}-macroglobulin into urine is prevented by its large size. The net result is that α_{2}-macroglobulin reaches serum levels equal to or greater than those of albumin in the nephrotic syndrome, which has the effect of maintaining oncotic pressure.

== Structure ==
Human α_{2}-macroglobulin is composed of four identical subunits bound together by disulfide bond. In addition to tetrameric forms of α_{2}-macroglobulin, dimeric, and more recently monomeric αM protease inhibitors have been identified.

Each monomer of human α_{2}-macroglobulin is composed of several functional domains, including macroglobulin domains, a thiol ester-containing domain and a receptor-binding domain. Overall, α_{2}-macroglobulin is the largest major nonimmunoglobulin protein in human plasma.

The amino acid sequence of α_{2}-macroglobulin has been shown to be 71% the same as that of the pregnancy zone protein (PZP; also known as pregnancy-associated α_{2}-glycoprotein).

== Function ==
The α-macroglobulin (αM) family of proteins includes protease inhibitors, typified by the human tetrameric α_{2}-macroglobulin (α_{2}M); they belong to the MEROPS proteinase inhibitor family I39, clan IL. These protease inhibitors share several defining properties, which include (1) the ability to inhibit proteases from all catalytic classes, (2) the presence of a 'bait region' (also known as a sequence of amino acids in an α_{2}-macroglobulin molecule, or a homologous protein, that contains scissile peptide bonds for those proteinases that it inhibits) and a thiol ester, (3) a similar protease inhibitory mechanism and (4) the inactivation of the inhibitory capacity by reaction of the thiol ester with small primary amines. αM protease inhibitors inhibit by steric hindrance. The mechanism involves protease cleavage of the bait region, a segment of the αM that is particularly susceptible to proteolytic cleavage, which initiates a conformational change such that the αM collapses about the protease. In the resulting αM-protease complex, the active site of the protease is sterically shielded, thus substantially decreasing access to protein substrates. Two additional events occur as a consequence of bait region cleavage, namely (1) the h-cysteinyl-g-glutamyl thiol ester becomes highly reactive and (2) a major conformational change exposes a conserved COOH-terminal receptor binding domain (RBD). RBD exposure allows the αM protease complex to bind to clearance receptors and be removed from circulation. Tetrameric, dimeric, and, more recently, monomeric αM protease inhibitors have been identified.

α_{2}-Macroglobulin is able to inactivate an enormous variety of proteinases (including serine-, cysteine-, aspartic- and metalloproteinases). It functions as an inhibitor of fibrinolysis by inhibiting plasmin and kallikrein. It functions as an inhibitor of coagulation by inhibiting thrombin. α_{2}-Macroglobulin has in its structure a 35 amino acid "bait" region. Proteinases binding and cleaving the bait region become bound to α_{2}M. The proteinase–α_{2}M complex is recognised by macrophage receptors and cleared from the system.

Fibrinolysis (simplified). Blue arrows denote stimulation, and red arrows inhibition.

α_{2}-Macroglobulin is known to bind zinc, as well as copper in plasma, even more strongly than albumin, and such it is also known as transcuprein. 10 to 15% of copper in human plasma is chelated by α_{2}-macroglobulin.

== Disease ==
α_{2}-Macroglobulin levels are increased when the serum albumin levels are low, which is most commonly seen in nephrotic syndrome, a condition wherein the kidneys start to leak out some of the smaller blood proteins. Because of its size, α_{2}-macroglobulin is retained in the bloodstream. Increased production of all proteins means α_{2}-macroglobulin concentration increases. This increase has little adverse effect on the health but is used as a diagnostic clue.

An increase in α_{2}-Macroglobulin with normal amount of albumin mainly indicates acute and/or chronic inflammation.

A common variant (29.5%) (polymorphism) of α_{2}-macroglobulin may lead to increased risk of Alzheimer's disease. However, findings from meta-analyses have been inconclusive, and the association remains debated.

α_{2}-Macroglobulin binds to and removes the active forms of the gelatinase (MMP-2 and MMP-9) from the circulation via scavenger receptors on the phagocytes.
