= Alpha globulin =

Globular protein in the plasma

Schematic representation of a protein electrophoresis gel

Alpha globulins are a group of globular proteins in plasma that are highly mobile in alkaline or electrically charged solutions. They inhibit certain blood proteases and show significant inhibitor activity.

The alpha globulins typically have molecular weights of around 93 kDa.

== Examples ==
Alpha globulins include certain hormones, proteins that transport hormones, and other compounds, including prothrombin and HDL.

=== Alpha 1 globulins ===
- α_{1}-antitrypsin
- Alpha 1-antichymotrypsin
- Orosomucoid (acid glycoprotein)
- Serum amyloid A
- Alpha 1-lipoprotein
- Protein HC

=== Alpha 2 globulins ===
- Haptoglobin
- Alpha-2u globulin
- α_{2}-macroglobulin
- Ceruloplasmin
- Thyroxine-binding globulin
- Alpha 2-antiplasmin
- Protein C
- Alpha 2-lipoprotein
- Angiotensinogen
- Cortisol binding globulin
- Vitamin D-binding protein
