= SELENBP1 =

Protein-coding gene in humans

Identifiers
- Aliases: SELENBP1, HEL-S-134P, LPSB, SBP56, SP56, hSBP, selenium binding protein 1, MTO, EHMTO
- External IDs: OMIM: 604188; MGI: 104859; GeneCards: SELENBP1
Enzyme activity
EC #	BRENDA	ExPASy	KEGG	MetaCyc
1.8.3.4	↗	↗	↗	↗

Gene location (Human)
Chr.	Chromosome 1 (human)
Band	1q21.3	Start	151,364,304 bp
Band	1q21.3	End	151,372,707 bp

Gene location (Mouse)
Chr.	Chromosome 3 (mouse)
Band	3 F2.1|3 40.74 cM	Start	94,600,863 bp
Band	3 F2.1|3 40.74 cM	End	94,611,720 bp
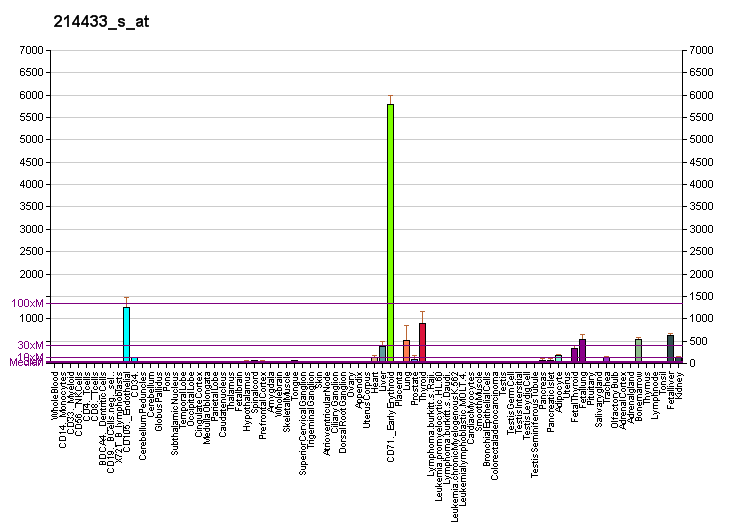
RNA expression pattern
Bgee	Human / Mouse (ortholog); Top expressed in: mucosa of transverse colon; rectum; mucosa of sigmoid colon; right uterine tube; right lobe of thyroid gland; right lobe of liver; left lobe of thyroid gland; body of stomach; olfactory zone of nasal mucosa; fundus / Top expressed in: liver; renal cortex; proximal tubule; white adipose tissue; right kidney; human kidney; right lung; pharynx; bone marrow; left lung; More reference expression data
BioGPS	More reference expression data
Gene ontology
Molecular function	selenium binding; protein binding; oxidoreductase activity; methanethiol oxidase activity
Cellular component	cytoplasm; cytosol; nucleolus; extracellular exosome; membrane; nucleus; fibrillar center; extracellular space
Biological process	protein transport; transport
Sources:Amigo / QuickGO
Orthologs
Databases	NCBI: entry; OMA: entry
Species	Human	Mouse
Entrez	8991	20342
Ensembl	ENSG00000143416	ENSMUSG00000068877
UniProt	Q13228	Q63836
RefSeq (mRNA)	NM_001258288; NM_001258289; NM_003944; NM_032183	NM_019414
RefSeq (protein)	NP_001245217; NP_001245218; NP_003935	NP_062287
Location (UCSC)	Chr 1: 151.36 – 151.37 Mb	Chr 3: 94.6 – 94.61 Mb
PubMed search
- Wikidata
View/Edit Human	View/Edit Mouse

Selenium-binding protein 1 is a protein that in humans is encoded by the SELENBP1 gene.

This gene product belongs to the selenium-binding protein family. Selenium is an essential nutrient that exhibits potent anticarcinogenic properties, and deficiency of selenium may cause certain neurologic diseases. It has been proposed that the effects of selenium in preventing cancer and neurologic diseases may be mediated by selenium-binding proteins. The exact function of this gene is not known.

== Interactions ==
SELENBP1 has been shown to interact with USP33.
