= USP33 =

Protein-coding gene in humans

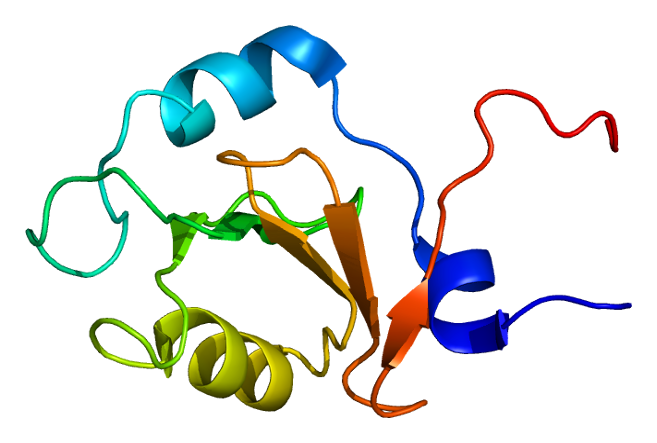

Identifiers
- Aliases: USP33, VDU1, ubiquitin specific peptidase 33
- External IDs: OMIM: 615146; MGI: 2159711; GeneCards: USP33
Available structures
PDB	Ortholog search: PDBe RCSB
PDB	List of PDB id codes 2UZG
Enzyme activity
EC #	BRENDA	ExPASy	KEGG	MetaCyc
3.4.19.12	↗	↗	↗	↗

Gene location (Human)
Chr.	Chromosome 1 (human)
Band	1p31.1	Start	77,695,987 bp
Band	1p31.1	End	77,759,852 bp

Gene location (Mouse)
Chr.	Chromosome 3 (mouse)
Band	3|3 H3	Start	152,052,115 bp
Band	3|3 H3	End	152,099,254 bp
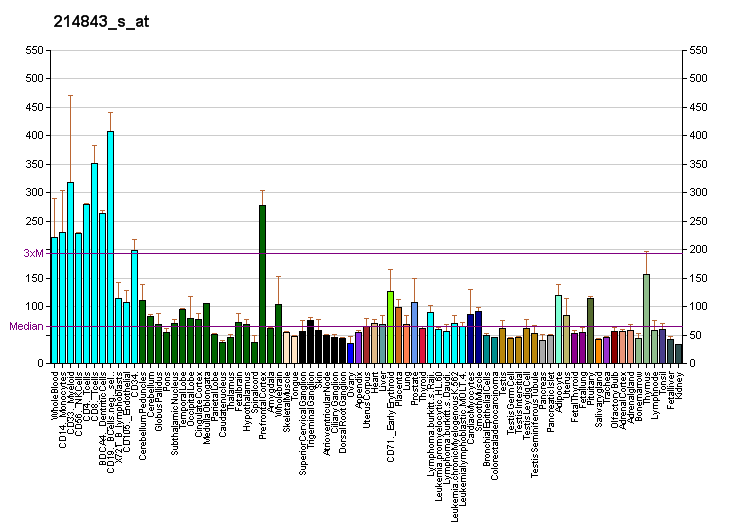

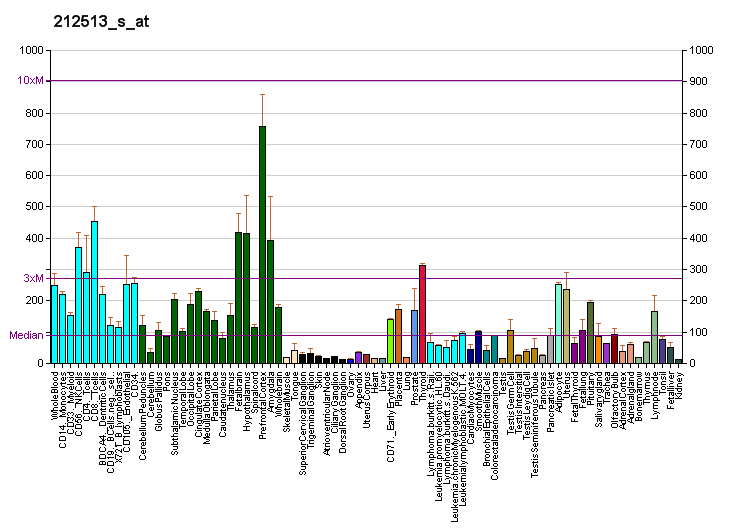
RNA expression pattern
Bgee	Human / Mouse (ortholog); Top expressed in: cerebellar vermis; Brodmann area 23; retinal pigment epithelium; pons; lateral nuclear group of thalamus; mucosa of paranasal sinus; parietal pleura; primary visual cortex; endothelial cell; middle temporal gyrus / Top expressed in: neural layer of retina; ventromedial nucleus; lobe of cerebellum; ventral tegmental area; mammillary body; dorsomedial hypothalamic nucleus; pontine nuclei; habenula; lateral hypothalamus; dorsal tegmental nucleus; More reference expression data
BioGPS	More reference expression data
Gene ontology
Molecular function	cysteine-type peptidase activity; zinc ion binding; metal ion binding; peptidase activity; ubiquitin binding; protein binding; thiol-dependent deubiquitinase; cysteine-type endopeptidase activity; hydrolase activity; G protein-coupled receptor binding
Cellular component	cytoplasm; cell body; centrosome; Golgi apparatus; VCB complex; focal adhesion; nucleoplasm; microtubule organizing center; autophagosome; perinuclear region of cytoplasm; cytoskeleton; cytosol
Biological process	endocytosis; protein K48-linked deubiquitination; ubiquitin-dependent protein catabolic process; regulation of G protein-coupled receptor signaling pathway; centrosome duplication; cellular response to starvation; protein stabilization; negative regulation of protein binding; proteolysis; axon guidance; regulation of autophagy; protein K63-linked deubiquitination; positive regulation of protein binding; cell migration; protein deubiquitination
Sources:Amigo / QuickGO
Orthologs
Databases	NCBI: entry; OMA: entry
Species	Human	Mouse
Entrez	23032	170822
Ensembl	ENSG00000077254	ENSMUSG00000025437
UniProt	Q8TEY7	Q8R5K2
RefSeq (mRNA)	NM_015017; NM_201624; NM_201626	NM_001076676; NM_001252486; NM_133247; NM_001355666
RefSeq (protein)	NP_055832; NP_963918; NP_963920; NP_001364359; NP_001364360 NP_001364361; NP_001364362; NP_001364363; NP_001364364; NP_001364365; NP_001364366; NP_001364367; NP_001364368	NP_001070144; NP_001239415; NP_573510; NP_001342595
Location (UCSC)	Chr 1: 77.7 – 77.76 Mb	Chr 3: 152.05 – 152.1 Mb
PubMed search
- Wikidata
View/Edit Human	View/Edit Mouse

Ubiquitin carboxyl-terminal hydrolase 33 is an enzyme that in humans is encoded by the USP33 gene.

== Interactions ==
USP33 has been shown to interact with DIO2, SELENBP1 and Von Hippel–Lindau tumor suppressor.
