= Large neutral amino acids transporter small subunit 3 =

Protein-coding gene in the species Homo sapiens

SLC43A1

Identifiers
- Aliases: SLC43A1, LAT3, PB39, POV1, R00504, solute carrier family 43 member 1
- External IDs: OMIM: 603733; MGI: 1931352; GeneCards: SLC43A1

Gene location (Human)
Chr.	Chromosome 11 (human)
Band	11q12.1	Start	57,484,534 bp
Band	11q12.1	End	57,515,780 bp

Gene location (Mouse)
Chr.	Chromosome 2 (mouse)
Band	2|2 D	Start	84,838,850 bp
Band	2|2 D	End	84,863,594 bp
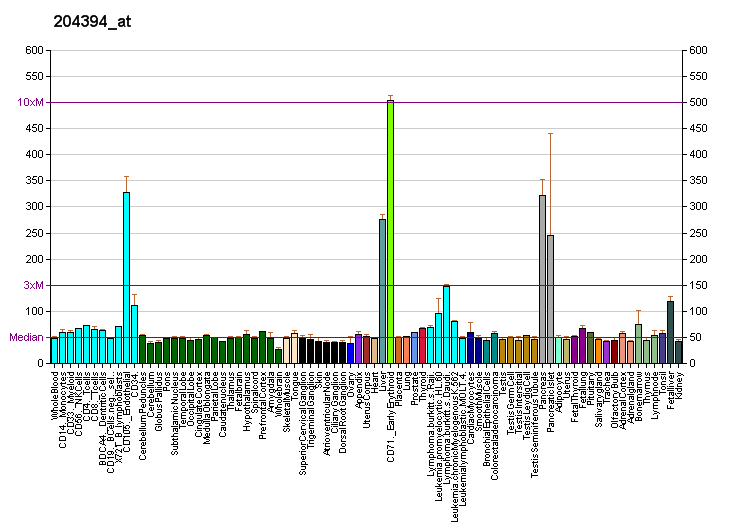
RNA expression pattern
Bgee	Human / Mouse (ortholog); Top expressed in: body of pancreas; right lobe of liver; gastric mucosa; body of stomach; right ovary; left ovary; gallbladder; gonad; muscle of thigh; stromal cell of endometrium / Top expressed in: muscle of thigh; tail of embryo; genital tubercle; thymus; embryo; yolk sac; human fetus; ventricular zone; bone marrow; spleen; More reference expression data
BioGPS	More reference expression data
Gene ontology
Molecular function	neutral amino acid transmembrane transporter activity; L-amino acid transmembrane transporter activity; amino acid transmembrane transporter activity
Cellular component	integral component of membrane; plasma membrane; integral component of plasma membrane; membrane
Biological process	amino acid transport; neutral amino acid transport; transmembrane transport; amino acid transmembrane transport; L-alpha-amino acid transmembrane transport
Sources:Amigo / QuickGO
Orthologs
Databases	NCBI: entry; OMA: entry
Species	Human	Mouse
Entrez	8501	72401
Ensembl	ENSG00000149150	ENSMUSG00000027075
UniProt	O75387	Q8BSM7
RefSeq (mRNA)	NM_001198810; NM_003627	NM_001081349; NM_001083809; NM_024497
RefSeq (protein)	NP_001185739; NP_003618	NP_001074818; NP_001077278; NP_078773
Location (UCSC)	Chr 11: 57.48 – 57.52 Mb	Chr 2: 84.84 – 84.86 Mb
PubMed search
- Wikidata
View/Edit Human	View/Edit Mouse

Large neutral amino acids transporter small subunit 3 is a protein that in humans is encoded by the SLC43A1 gene.

== See also ==
- SLC43A1+protein,+human at the U.S. National Library of Medicine Medical Subject Headings (MeSH)
