= Solute carrier family =

Family of membrane transport proteins

The solute carrier (SLC) group of membrane transport proteins include over 400 members organized into 66 families. Most members of the SLC group are located in the cell membrane. The SLC gene nomenclature system was originally proposed by the HUGO Gene Nomenclature Committee (HGNC) and is the basis for the official HGNC names of the genes that encode these transporters. A more general transmembrane transporter classification can be found in TCDB database.

Solutes that are transported by the various SLC group members are extremely diverse and include both charged and uncharged organic molecules as well as inorganic ions and the gas ammonia.

As is typical of integral membrane proteins, SLCs contain a number of hydrophobic transmembrane alpha helices connected to each other by hydrophilic intra- and extra-cellular loops. Depending on the SLC, these transporters are functional as either monomers or obligate homo- or hetero-oligomers. Many SLC families are members of the major facilitator superfamily.

== Scope ==
By convention of the nomenclature system, members within an individual SLC family have greater than 20-25% sequence identity to each other. In contrast, the homology between SLC families is very low to non-existent. Hence, the criteria for inclusion of a family into the SLC group is not evolutionary relatedness to other SLC families but rather functional (i.e., an integral membrane protein that transports a solute).

The SLC group include examples of transport proteins that are:

- facilitative transporters (allow solutes to flow downhill with their electrochemical gradients)
- secondary active transporters (allow solutes to flow uphill against their electrochemical gradient by coupling to transport of a second solute that flows downhill with its gradient such that the overall free energy change is still favorable)

The SLC series does not include members of transport protein families that have previously been classified by other widely accepted nomenclature systems including:

- primary active transporters (allow flow uphill against electrochemical gradients) such as ABC (ATP Binding Cassette) transporters by coupling transport to an energy releasing event such as ATP hydrolysis
- ion channels
- aquaporins (water channels)

== Subcellular distribution ==
Most members of the SLC group are located in the cell membrane, but some members are located in mitochondria (the most notable one being SLC family 25) or other intracellular organelles.

== Nomenclature system ==
Names of individual SLC members have the following format:

$\ce{SLCnXm}$

where:

- SLC is the root name (SoLute Carrier)
- n = an integer representing a family (e.g., 1-52)
- X = a single letter (A, B, C, ...) denoting a subfamily
- m = an integer representing an individual family member (isoform).

For example, SLC1A1 is the first isoform of subfamily A of SLC family 1.

An exception occurs with SLC family 21 (the organic anion transporting polypeptide transporters), which for historical reasons have names in the format SLCOnXm where n = family number, X = subfamily letter, and m = member number.

While the HGNC only assign nomenclature to human genes, by convention vertebrate orthologs of these genes adopt the same nomenclature (e.g., VGNC-assigned orthologs of SLC10A1). For rodents, the case of the symbols differs from other vertebrates by using title case, i.e. Slc1a1 denotes the rodent ortholog of the human SLC1A1 gene.

== Families ==
The following families are named under SLC:

1. high-affinity glutamate and neutral amino acid transporter
  - (SLC1A1, SLC1A2, SLC1A3, SLC1A4, SLC1A5, SLC1A6, SLC1A7)
2. facilitative GLUT transporter
  - (SLC2A1, SLC2A2, SLC2A3, SLC2A4, SLC2A5, SLC2A6, SLC2A7, SLC2A8, SLC2A9, SLC2A10, SLC2A11, SLC2A12, SLC2A13, SLC2A14)
3. heavy subunits of heterodimeric amino acid transporters
  - (SLC3A1, SLC3A2)
4. bicarbonate transporter
  - (SLC4A1, SLC4A2, SLC4A3, SLC4A4, SLC4A5, SLC4A6, SLC4A7, SLC4A8, SLC4A9, SLC4A10, SLC4A11)
5. sodium glucose cotransporter
  - (SLC5A1, SLC5A2, SLC5A3, SLC5A4, SLC5A5, SLC5A6, SLC5A7, SLC5A8, SLC5A9, SLC5A10, SLC5A11, SLC5A12)
6. sodium- and chloride-dependent sodium:neurotransmitter symporters
  - (SLC6A1, SLC6A2, SLC6A3, SLC6A4, SLC6A5, SLC6A6, SLC6A7, SLC6A8, SLC6A9, SLC6A10, SLC6A11, SLC6A12, SLC6A13, SLC6A14, SLC6A15, SLC6A16, SLC6A17, SLC6A18, SLC6A19, SLC6A20)
7. cationic amino acid transporter/glycoprotein-associated
  - cationic amino acid transporters (SLC7A1, SLC7A2, SLC7A3, SLC7A4)
  - glycoprotein-associated/light or catalytic subunits of heterodimeric amino acid transporters (SLC7A5, SLC7A6, SLC7A7, SLC7A8, SLC7A9, SLC7A10, SLC7A11, SLC7A13, SLC7A14)
8. Na+/Ca2+ exchanger
  - (SLC8A1, SLC8A2, SLC8A3)
9. Na+/H+ exchanger
  - (SLC9A1, SLC9A2, SLC9A3, SLC9A4, SLC9A5, SLC9A6, SLC9A7, SLC9A8, SLC9A9, SLC9A10, SLC9A11, SLC9B1, SLC9B2)
10. sodium bile salt cotransport
  - (SLC10A1, SLC10A2, SLC10A3, SLC10A4, SLC10A5, SLC10A6, SLC10A7)
11. proton coupled metal ion transporter
  - (SLC11A1, SLC11A2)
12. electroneutral cation-Cl cotransporter
  - (SLC12A1, SLC12A2, SLC12A3, SLC12A4, SLC12A5, SLC12A6, SLC12A7, SLC12A8, SLC12A9)
13. Na+-sulfate/carboxylate cotransporter
  - (SLC13A1, SLC13A2, SLC13A3, SLC13A4, SLC13A5)
14. urea transporter
  - (SLC14A1, SLC14A2)
15. proton oligopeptide cotransporter
  - (SLC15A1, SLC15A2, SLC15A3, SLC15A4)
16. monocarboxylate transporter
  - (SLC16A1, SLC16A2, SLC16A3, SLC16A4, SLC16A5, SLC16A6, SLC16A7, SLC16A8, SLC16A9, SLC16A10, SLC16A11, SLC16A12, SLC16A13, SLC16A14)
17. vesicular glutamate transporter
  - (SLC17A1, SLC17A2, SLC17A3, SLC17A4, SLC17A5, SLC17A6, SLC17A7, SLC17A8, SLC17A9)
18. vesicular amine transporter
  - (SLC18A1, SLC18A2, SLC18A3)
19. folate/thiamine transporter
  - (SLC19A1, SLC19A2, SLC19A3)
20. type III Na+-phosphate cotransporter
  - (SLC20A1, SLC20A2)
21. organic anion transporting
  - subfamily 1 (SLCO1A2, SLCO1B1, SLCO1B3, SLCO1C1)
  - subfamily 2 (SLCO2A1, SLCO2B1)
  - subfamily 3 (SLCO3A1)
  - subfamily 4 (SLCO4A1, SLCO4C1)
  - subfamily 5 (SLCO5A1)
  - subfamily 6 (SLCO6A1)
22. organic cation/anion/zwitterion transporter
  - (SLC22A1, SLC22A2, SLC22A3, SLC22A4, SLC22A5, SLC22A6, SLC22A7, SLC22A8, SLC22A9, SLC22A10, SLC22A11, SLC22A12, SLC22A13, SLC22A14, SLC22A15, SLC22A16, SLC22A17, SLC22A18, SLC22A18AS, SLC22A19, SLC22A20, SLC22A23, SLC22A24, SLC22A25, SLC22A31)
23. Na+-dependent ascorbic acid transporter
  - (SLC23A1, SLC23A2, SLC23A3, SLC23A4)
24. Na+/(Ca2+-K+) exchanger
  - (SLC24A1, SLC24A2, SLC24A3, SLC24A4, SLC24A5, SLC24A6)
25. mitochondrial carrier
  - (SLC25A1, SLC25A2, SLC25A3, SLC25A4, SLC25A5, SLC25A6, UCP1(SLC25A7), UCP2(SLC25A8), UCP3(SLC25A9), SLC25A10, SLC25A11, SLC25A12, SLC25A13, SLC25A14, SLC25A15, SLC25A16, SLC25A17, SLC25A18, SLC25A19, SLC25A20, SLC25A21, SLC25A22, SLC25A23, SLC25A24, SLC25A25, SLC25A26, SLC25A27, SLC25A28, SLC25A29, SLC25A30, SLC25A31, SLC25A32, SLC25A33, SLC25A34, SLC25A35, SLC25A36, SLC25A37, SLC25A38, SLC25A39, SLC25A40, SLC25A41, SLC25A42, SLC25A43, SLC25A44, SLC25A45, SLC25A46), SLC25A47, SLC25A48, MTCH1(SLC25A49), MTCH2(SLC25A50), SLC25A51, SLC25A52, SLC25A53
26. multifunctional anion exchanger
  - (SLC26A1, SLC26A2, SLC26A3, SLC26A4, SLC26A5, SLC26A6, SLC26A7, SLC26A8, SLC26A9, SLC26A10, SLC26A11)
27. fatty acid transport proteins
  - (SLC27A1, SLC27A2, SLC27A3, SLC27A4, SLC27A5, SLC27A6)
28. Na+-coupled nucleoside transport
  - (SLC28A1, SLC28A2, SLC28A3)
29. facilitative nucleoside transporter
  - (SLC29A1, SLC29A2, SLC29A3, SLC29A4)
30. zinc transporter
  - (SLC30A1, SLC30A2, SLC30A3, SLC30A4, SLC30A5, SLC30A6, SLC30A7, SLC30A8, SLC30A9, SLC30A10)
31. copper transporter
  - (SLC31A1, SLC31A2)
32. vesicular inhibitory amino acid transporter
  - (SLC32A1)
33. Acetyl-CoA transporter
  - (SLC33A1)
34. type II Na+-phosphate cotransporter
  - (SLC34A1, SLC34A2, SLC34A3)
35. nucleotide-sugar transporter
  - subfamily A (SLC35A1, SLC35A2, SLC35A3, SLC35A4, SLC35A5)
  - subfamily B (SLC35B1, SLC35B2, SLC35B3, SLC35B4)
  - subfamily C (SLC35C1, SLC35C2)
  - subfamily D (SLC35D1, SLC35D2, SLC35D3)
  - subfamily E (SLC35E1, SLC35E2A, SLC35E2B, SLC35E3, SLC35E4)
  - subfamily F (SLC35F1, SLC35F2, SLC35F3, SLC35F4, SLC35F5)
  - subfamily G (SLC35G1, SLC35G3, SLC35G4, SLC35G5, SLC35G6)
36. proton-coupled amino acid transporter
  - (SLC36A1, SLC36A2, SLC36A3, SLC36A4)
37. sugar-phosphate/phosphate exchanger
  - (SLC37A1, SLC37A2, SLC37A3, SLC37A4)
38. System A & N, sodium-coupled neutral amino acid transporter
  - (SLC38A1, SLC38A2, SLC38A3, SLC38A4, SLC38A5, SLC38A6, SLC38A7, SLC38A8, SLC38A9, SLC38A10, SLC38A11)
39. metal ion transporter
  - (SLC39A1, SLC39A2, SLC39A3, SLC39A4, SLC39A5, SLC39A6, SLC39A7, SLC39A8, SLC39A9, SLC39A10, SLC39A11, SLC39A12, SLC39A13, SLC39A14)
40. basolateral iron transporter
  - (SLC40A1)
41. MgtE-like magnesium transporter
  - (SLC41A1, SLC41A2, SLC41A3)
42. Ammonia transporter
  - (RHAG(SLC42A1), RHBG(SLC42A2), RHCG(SLC42A3))
43. Na+-independent, system-L like amino acid transporter
  - (SLC43A1, SLC43A2, SLC43A3)
44. Choline-like transporter
  - (SLC44A1, SLC44A2, SLC44A3, SLC44A4, SLC44A5)
45. Putative sugar transporter
  - (SLC45A1, SLC45A2, SLC45A3, SLC45A4)
46. Folate transporter
  - (SLC46A1, SLC46A2, SLC46A3)
47. multidrug and toxin extrusion
  - (SLC47A1, SLC47A2)
48. Heme transporter family
  - (SLC48A1)
49. Heme transporter
  - (FLVCR1(SLC49A1), FLVCR2(SLC49A2), SLC49A3, SLC49A4)
50. Sugar efflux transporters of the SWEET family
  - (SLC50A1)
51. Transporters of steroid-derived molecules
  - (SLC51A, SLC51B)
52. Riboflavin transporter family RFVT/SLC52
  - (SLC52A1, SLC52A2, SLC52A3)
53. Phosphate carriers
  - (XPR1(SLC53A1))
54. Mitochondrial pyruvate carriers
  - (MPC1(SLC54A1), MPC2(SLC54A2), MPC1L(SLC54A3))
55. Mitochondrial cation/proton exchangers
  - (LETM1(SLC55A1), LETM2(SLC55A2), LETMD1(SLC55A3))
56. Sideroflexins
  - (SFXN1(SLC56A1), SFXN2(SLC56A2), SFXN3(SLC56A3), SFXN4(SLC56A4), SFXN5(SLC56A5))
57. NiPA-like magnesium transporter family
  - (NIPA1(SLC57A1), NIPA2(SLC57A2), NIPAL1(SLC57A3), NIPAL2(SLC57A4), NIPAL3(SLC57A5), NIPAL4(SLC57A6))
58. MagT-like magnesium transporter family
  - (MAGT1(SLC58A1), TUSC3(SLC58A2))
59. Sodium-dependent lysophosphatidylcholine symporter family
  - (MFSD2A(SLC59A1), MFSD2B(SLC59A2))
60. Glucose transporters
  - (MFSD4A(SLC60A1), MFSD4B(SLC60A2))
61. Molybdate transporter family
  - (MFSD5(SLC61A1))
62. Pyrophosphate transporters
  - (ANKH(SLC62A1))
63. Sphingosine-phosphate transporters
  - (SPNS1(SLC63A1), SPNS2(SLC63A2), SPNS3(SLC63A3))
64. Golgi Ca2+/H+ exchangers
  - (TMEM165(SLC64A1))
65. NPC-type cholesterol transporters
  - (NPC1(SLC65A1), NPC1L1(SLC65A2))
66. Cationic amino acid exporters
  - (SLC66A1, SLC66A2, SLC66A3, CTNS(SLC66A4), MPDU1(SLC66A5))

== Putative SLCs ==
Putative SLCs, also called atypical SLCs, are novel, plausible secondary active or facilitative transporter proteins that share ancestral background with the known SLCs. The atypical SLCs of MFS type can, however, be subdivided into 15 Putative MFS Transporter Families (AMTF).

All the putative SLCs are plausible SLC transporters. Some are only "atypical" when it comes to their nomenclature; the genes have an SLC assignment but as an alias, and have retained their already assigned "non-SLC" gene symbol as the approved symbol.

Here are some putative SLCs listed: OCA2, CLN3, TMEM104, SPNS1, SPNS2, SPNS3, SV2A, SV2B, SV2C, SVOP, SVOPL, MFSD1, MFSD2A, MFSD2B, MFSD3, MFSD4A, MFSD4B, MFSD5, MFSD6, MFSD6L, MFSD8, MFSD9, MFSD10, MFSD11, MFSD12, MFSD13A, MFSD14A, MFSD14B, UNC93A and UNC93B1.
