= SLC68A1 =

Protein encoding gene in humans

Identifiers
- Aliases: SLC68A1, C10orf77, bA18I14.8, TMEM180, major facilitator superfamily domain containing 13A
- External IDs: MGI: 1922396; GeneCards: SLC68A1

Gene location (Human)
Chr.	Chromosome 10 (human)
Band	10q24.32	Start	102,461,395 bp
Band	10q24.32	End	102,477,045 bp

Gene location (Mouse)
Chr.	Chromosome 19 (mouse)
Band	19|19 C3	Start	46,329,560 bp
Band	19|19 C3	End	46,363,691 bp
RNA expression pattern
Bgee	Human / Mouse (ortholog); Top expressed in: right hemisphere of cerebellum; right frontal lobe; nucleus accumbens; caudate nucleus; anterior cingulate cortex; granulocyte; upper lobe of left lung; right lung; putamen; Brodmann area 9 / Top expressed in: olfactory tubercle; arcuate nucleus; ventromedial nucleus; substantia nigra; globus pallidus; median eminence; paraventricular nucleus of hypothalamus; subiculum; yolk sac; epithelium of small intestine; More reference expression data
BioGPS	n/a
Orthologs
Databases	NCBI: entry; OMA: entry
Species	Human	Mouse
Entrez	79847	75146
Ensembl	ENSG00000138111	ENSMUSG00000025227
UniProt	Q14CX5	Q6PDE8
RefSeq (mRNA)	NM_024789	NM_029186
RefSeq (protein)	NP_079065	NP_083462
Location (UCSC)	Chr 10: 102.46 – 102.48 Mb	Chr 19: 46.33 – 46.36 Mb
PubMed search
- Wikidata
View/Edit Human	View/Edit Mouse

SLC68A1 is a protein that in humans is encoded by the SLC68A1 gene. SLC68A1 encodes the protein solute carrier family 68 member 1, which is a poorly characterized solute carrier protein.
