= Zinc transporter ZIP5 =

Protein-coding gene in the species Homo sapiens

SLC39A5

Identifiers
- Aliases: SLC39A5, LZT-Hs7, MYP24, ZIP5, solute carrier family 39 member 5
- External IDs: OMIM: 608730; MGI: 1919336; GeneCards: SLC39A5

Gene location (Human)
Chr.	Chromosome 12 (human)
Band	12q13.3	Start	56,230,049 bp
Band	12q13.3	End	56,237,846 bp

Gene location (Mouse)
Chr.	Chromosome 10 (mouse)
Band	10|10 D3	Start	128,231,800 bp
Band	10|10 D3	End	128,237,098 bp
RNA expression pattern
Bgee	Human / Mouse (ortholog); Top expressed in: body of pancreas; mucosa of transverse colon; right lobe of liver; duodenum; rectum; jejunal mucosa; human kidney; mucosa of ileum; mucosa of sigmoid colon; epithelium of colon / Top expressed in: yolk sac; jejunum; duodenum; ileum; right kidney; epithelium of small intestine; colon; left colon; migratory enteric neural crest cell; human kidney; More reference expression data
BioGPS	n/a
Gene ontology
Molecular function	metal ion transmembrane transporter activity; zinc ion transmembrane transporter activity; molecular function
Cellular component	integral component of membrane; plasma membrane; basolateral plasma membrane; extracellular exosome; membrane; integral component of plasma membrane
Biological process	eye development; metal ion transport; G1 to G0 transition involved in cell differentiation; zinc ion transport; ion transport; cellular response to zinc ion starvation; BMP signaling pathway; positive regulation of mRNA splicing, via spliceosome; neural precursor cell proliferation; zinc ion import across plasma membrane; cellular zinc ion homeostasis; transmembrane transport; transport
Sources:Amigo / QuickGO
Orthologs
Databases	NCBI: entry; OMA: entry
Species	Human	Mouse
Entrez	283375	72002
Ensembl	ENSG00000139540	ENSMUSG00000039878
UniProt	Q6ZMH5	Q9D856
RefSeq (mRNA)	NM_001135195; NM_173596	NM_001136237; NM_028051; NM_028092
RefSeq (protein)	NP_001128667; NP_775867	NP_001129709; NP_082327; NP_082368
Location (UCSC)	Chr 12: 56.23 – 56.24 Mb	Chr 10: 128.23 – 128.24 Mb
PubMed search
- Wikidata
View/Edit Human	View/Edit Mouse

Zinc transporter ZIP5, also known as solute carrier family 39 member 5, is a protein that in humans is encoded by the SLC39A5 gene.

== See also ==
- Solute carrier family
