= Choline transporter-like protein 4 =

Protein-coding gene in the species Homo sapiens

SLC44A4

Identifiers
- Aliases: SLC44A4, C6orf29, CTL4, NG22, TPPT, solute carrier family 44 member 4, DFNA72, hTPPT1
- External IDs: OMIM: 606107; MGI: 1917379; GeneCards: SLC44A4

Gene location (Human)
Chr.	Chromosome 6 (human)
Band	6p21.33	Start	31,863,192 bp
Band	6p21.33	End	31,879,046 bp

Gene location (Mouse)
Chr.	Chromosome 17 (mouse)
Band	17|17 B1	Start	35,133,442 bp
Band	17|17 B1	End	35,149,412 bp
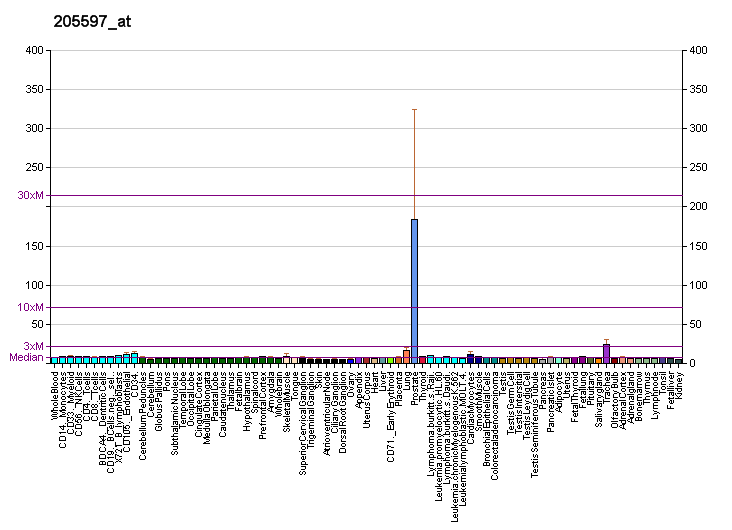
RNA expression pattern
Bgee	Human / Mouse (ortholog); Top expressed in: mucosa of transverse colon; right uterine tube; rectum; duodenum; olfactory zone of nasal mucosa; gallbladder; prostate; islet of Langerhans; human kidney; appendix / Top expressed in: left colon; epithelium of stomach; ileum; intestinal villus; Ileal epithelium; mucous cell of stomach; right kidney; pyloric antrum; jejunum; proximal tubule; More reference expression data
BioGPS	More reference expression data
Gene ontology
Molecular function	choline transmembrane transporter activity; thiamine pyrophosphate transmembrane transporter activity
Cellular component	extracellular exosome; membrane; integral component of membrane; plasma membrane; apical plasma membrane
Biological process	acetylcholine secretion; phosphatidylcholine biosynthetic process; transmembrane transport; acetylcholine biosynthetic process; positive regulation of cell growth; choline transport; thiamine pyrophosphate transmembrane transport; otolith formation; neuromast hair cell development
Sources:Amigo / QuickGO
Orthologs
Databases	NCBI: entry; OMA: entry
Species	Human	Mouse
Entrez	80736	70129
Ensembl	ENSG00000232180; ENSG00000204385; ENSG00000231479; ENSG00000228263; ENSG00000206378 ENSG00000235336; ENSG00000229077; ENSG00000203463	ENSMUSG00000007034
UniProt	Q53GD3	Q91VA1
RefSeq (mRNA)	NM_025257; NM_001178044; NM_001178045	NM_023557
RefSeq (protein)	NP_001171515; NP_001171516; NP_079533	NP_076046
Location (UCSC)	Chr 6: 31.86 – 31.88 Mb	Chr 17: 35.13 – 35.15 Mb
PubMed search
- Wikidata
View/Edit Human	View/Edit Mouse

Choline transporter-like protein 4 is a protein that in humans is encoded by the SLC44A4 gene.

== See also ==
- Solute carrier family
