= UDP-xylose and UDP-N-acetylglucosamine transporter =

Protein found in humans

SLC35B4

Identifiers
- Aliases: SLC35B4, YEA, YEA4, solute carrier family 35 member B4
- External IDs: OMIM: 610923; MGI: 1931249; GeneCards: SLC35B4

Gene location (Human)
Chr.	Chromosome 7 (human)
Band	7q33	Start	134,289,332 bp
Band	7q33	End	134,316,930 bp

Gene location (Mouse)
Chr.	Chromosome 6 (mouse)
Band	6|6 A3.3	Start	34,130,315 bp
Band	6|6 A3.3	End	34,154,046 bp
RNA expression pattern
Bgee	Human / Mouse (ortholog); Top expressed in: cerebellar vermis; middle temporal gyrus; Brodmann area 23; endothelial cell; placenta; retinal pigment epithelium; gonad; tibia; lateral nuclear group of thalamus; superior frontal gyrus / Top expressed in: otic vesicle; right kidney; saccule; otic placode; zygote; proximal tubule; yolk sac; human kidney; secondary oocyte; superior frontal gyrus; More reference expression data
BioGPS	n/a
Gene ontology
Molecular function	protein binding; UDP-xylose transmembrane transporter activity; GDP-fucose transmembrane transporter activity; UDP-N-acetylglucosamine transmembrane transporter activity; 3'-phosphoadenosine 5'-phosphosulfate transmembrane transporter activity; transmembrane transporter activity
Cellular component	integral component of membrane; endoplasmic reticulum; membrane; integral component of Golgi membrane; integral component of endoplasmic reticulum membrane; Golgi apparatus; Golgi membrane
Biological process	UDP-xylose transmembrane transport; regulation of gluconeogenesis; carbohydrate transport; transmembrane transport; GDP-fucose transmembrane transport; UDP-N-acetylglucosamine transmembrane transport; 3'-phospho-5'-adenylyl sulfate transmembrane transport
Sources:Amigo / QuickGO
Orthologs
Databases	NCBI: entry; OMA: entry
Species	Human	Mouse
Entrez	84912	58246
Ensembl	ENSG00000205060	ENSMUSG00000018999
UniProt	Q969S0	Q8CIA5
RefSeq (mRNA)	NM_032826	NM_021435
RefSeq (protein)	NP_116215	NP_067410
Location (UCSC)	Chr 7: 134.29 – 134.32 Mb	Chr 6: 34.13 – 34.15 Mb
PubMed search
- Wikidata
View/Edit Human	View/Edit Mouse

UDP-xylose and UDP-N-acetylglucosamine transporter is a protein that in humans is encoded by the SLC35B4 gene.

== See also ==
- Solute carrier family
