= SLC25A51 =

Human gene and protein

Identifiers
- Aliases: SLC25A51, CG7943, MCART1, solute carrier family 25 member 51
- External IDs: MGI: 2684984; GeneCards: SLC25A51

Gene location (Human)
Chr.	Chromosome 9 (human)
Band	9p13.2-p13.1	Start	37,879,400 bp
Band	9p13.2-p13.1	End	37,904,353 bp

Gene location (Mouse)
Chr.	Chromosome 4 (mouse)
Band	4|4 B1	Start	45,395,923 bp
Band	4|4 B1	End	45,408,766 bp
RNA expression pattern
Bgee	Human / Mouse (ortholog); Top expressed in: gonad; islet of Langerhans; stromal cell of endometrium; bone marrow cell; secondary oocyte; gastrocnemius muscle; right ventricle; monocyte; ganglionic eminence; epithelium of colon / Top expressed in: fetal liver hematopoietic progenitor cell; Rostral migratory stream; brown adipose tissue; blood; knee joint; vastus lateralis muscle; motor neuron; intercostal muscle; right kidney; muscle of thigh; More reference expression data
BioGPS	n/a
Gene ontology
Molecular function	transmembrane transporter activity
Cellular component	membrane; mitochondrion; mitochondrial inner membrane; integral component of membrane
Biological process	mitochondrial transport; transmembrane transport
Sources:Amigo / QuickGO
Orthologs
Databases	NCBI: entry; OMA: entry
Species	Human	Mouse
Entrez	92014	230125
Ensembl	ENSG00000122696	ENSMUSG00000045973
UniProt	Q9H1U9	Q5HZI9
RefSeq (mRNA)	NM_033412	NM_001009949
RefSeq (protein)	NP_219480	NP_001009949
Location (UCSC)	Chr 9: 37.88 – 37.9 Mb	Chr 4: 45.4 – 45.41 Mb
PubMed search
- Wikidata
View/Edit Human	View/Edit Mouse

Solute carrier family 25 member 51, also known as SLC25A51 and MCART1, is a protein which in humans is encoded by the SLC25A51 gene. This gene encodes a mitochondrial NAD^{+} transporter and is a member of the mitochondrial carrier family of solute carrier proteins.

== Structure ==
The SLC25A51 gene is located on the p arm of chromosome 9 in position 13.2 and spans 24,954 base pairs. The gene produces a 33.7 kDa protein composed of 297 amino acids. This gene has 6 exons and encodes a multi-pass integral membrane protein localized to the mitochondrial inner membrane.

== Function ==
The product of this gene (MCART1) is essential for the import of NAD^{+} into the mitochondria.

== Clinical significance ==
Diseases associated with this gene include urea cycle disorders.

== See also ==
- Solute carrier family
- Mitochondrial carrier family
- Nicotinamide adenine dinulceotide
