= SFXN3 =

Protein-coding gene in the species Homo sapiens

Identifiers
- Aliases: SFXN3, BA108L7.2, SFX3, sideroflexin 3, SLC56A3
- External IDs: OMIM: 615571; MGI: 2137679; GeneCards: SFXN3

Gene location (Human)
Chr.	Chromosome 10 (human)
Band	10q24.31	Start	101,031,234 bp
Band	10q24.31	End	101,041,244 bp

Gene location (Mouse)
Chr.	Chromosome 19 (mouse)
Band	19|19 C3	Start	45,035,942 bp
Band	19|19 C3	End	45,044,822 bp
RNA expression pattern
Bgee	Human / Mouse (ortholog); Top expressed in: cerebellar hemisphere; tendon of biceps brachii; right hemisphere of cerebellum; paraflocculus of cerebellum; saphenous vein; pancreatic ductal cell; ascending aorta; Descending thoracic aorta; cerebellar vermis; synovial joint / Top expressed in: aortic valve; ascending aorta; visual cortex; superior frontal gyrus; primary visual cortex; cumulus cell; external carotid artery; substantia nigra; saccule; piriform cortex; More reference expression data
BioGPS	n/a
Gene ontology
Molecular function	ion transmembrane transporter activity; serine transmembrane transporter activity
Cellular component	integral component of membrane; mitochondrial membranes; mitochondrion; membrane
Biological process	ion transmembrane transport; iron ion homeostasis; ion transport; transmembrane transport; one-carbon metabolic process; serine import into mitochondrion; mitochondrial transmembrane transport; amino acid transport
Sources:Amigo / QuickGO
Orthologs
Databases	NCBI: entry; OMA: entry
Species	Human	Mouse
Entrez	81855	94280
Ensembl	ENSG00000107819	ENSMUSG00000025212
UniProt	Q9BWM7	Q91V61
RefSeq (mRNA)	NM_030971	NM_001178012; NM_001178013; NM_053197; NM_001362379; NM_001362380 NM_001362381
RefSeq (protein)	NP_112233	NP_001171483; NP_001171484; NP_444427; NP_001349308; NP_001349309 NP_001349310
Location (UCSC)	Chr 10: 101.03 – 101.04 Mb	Chr 19: 45.04 – 45.04 Mb
PubMed search
- Wikidata
View/Edit Human	View/Edit Mouse

Sideroflexin-3 is a protein that in humans is encoded by the SFXN3 gene. Sideroflexin-3 is a membrane transporter that belongs to solute carrier family 56. It is associated with amino acid transport and mitochondrial transmembrane transport, and also has role in the one-carbon metabolic process.
