= Zinc transporter 7 =

Protein found in humans

SLC30A7

Identifiers
- Aliases: SLC30A7, ZNT7, ZnT-7, ZnTL2, solute carrier family 30 member 7
- External IDs: OMIM: 611149; MGI: 1913750; GeneCards: SLC30A7

Gene location (Human)
Chr.	Chromosome 1 (human)
Band	1p21.2	Start	100,896,076 bp
Band	1p21.2	End	100,981,757 bp

Gene location (Mouse)
Chr.	Chromosome 3 (mouse)
Band	3|3 G1	Start	115,732,622 bp
Band	3|3 G1	End	115,801,055 bp
RNA expression pattern
Bgee	Human / Mouse (ortholog); Top expressed in: pancreatic ductal cell; buccal mucosa cell; cartilage tissue; mucosa of paranasal sinus; tibia; visceral pleura; nasal epithelium; mucosa of ileum; jejunal mucosa; thymus / Top expressed in: lacrimal gland; seminal vesicula; ectoderm; otic vesicle; saccule; Paneth cell; otic placode; medullary collecting duct; salivary gland; submandibular gland; More reference expression data
BioGPS	n/a
Gene ontology
Molecular function	cation transmembrane transporter activity; zinc ion transmembrane transporter activity
Cellular component	cytoplasm; integral component of membrane; perinuclear region of cytoplasm; vesicle; Golgi apparatus; membrane; cytoplasmic vesicle
Biological process	sequestering of zinc ion; regulation of sequestering of zinc ion; response to zinc ion; cation transport; zinc ion transport; ion transport; cation transmembrane transport; zinc ion transmembrane transport; transmembrane transport
Sources:Amigo / QuickGO
Orthologs
Databases	NCBI: entry; OMA: entry
Species	Human	Mouse
Entrez	148867	66500
Ensembl	ENSG00000162695	ENSMUSG00000054414
UniProt	Q8NEW0	Q9JKN1
RefSeq (mRNA)	NM_001144884; NM_133496	NM_023214
RefSeq (protein)	NP_001138356; NP_598003	NP_075703
Location (UCSC)	Chr 1: 100.9 – 100.98 Mb	Chr 3: 115.73 – 115.8 Mb
PubMed search
- Wikidata
View/Edit Human	View/Edit Mouse

Zinc transporter 7 is a protein that in humans is encoded by the SLC30A7 gene.

== See also ==
- Solute carrier family
