= Sodium–hydrogen antiporter 2 =

Protein-coding gene in the species Homo sapiens

SLC9A2

Identifiers
- Aliases: SLC9A2, NHE2, solute carrier family 9 member A2
- External IDs: OMIM: 600530; MGI: 105075; GeneCards: SLC9A2

Gene location (Human)
Chr.	Chromosome 2 (human)
Band	2q12.1	Start	102,619,553 bp
Band	2q12.1	End	102,711,355 bp

Gene location (Mouse)
Chr.	Chromosome 1 (mouse)
Band	1 B|1 19.66 cM	Start	40,719,734 bp
Band	1 B|1 19.66 cM	End	40,808,433 bp
RNA expression pattern
Bgee	Human / Mouse (ortholog); Top expressed in: rectum; testicle; mucosa of transverse colon; mucosa of sigmoid colon; buccal mucosa cell; pylorus; muscle of thigh; body of stomach; epithelium of colon; gastrocnemius muscle / Top expressed in: interventricular septum; left colon; jejunum; prostate; epithelium of stomach; seminal vesicula; lobe of prostate; extraocular muscle; duodenum; sternocleidomastoid muscle; More reference expression data
BioGPS	n/a
Gene ontology
Molecular function	solute:proton antiporter activity; antiporter activity; potassium:proton antiporter activity; sodium:proton antiporter activity
Cellular component	integral component of membrane; membrane; plasma membrane
Biological process	proton transmembrane transport; protein localization; cation transport; ion transport; regulation of pH; sodium ion transport; regulation of intracellular pH; sodium ion import across plasma membrane; potassium ion transmembrane transport; transmembrane transport; anion transmembrane transport
Sources:Amigo / QuickGO
Orthologs
Databases	NCBI: entry; OMA: entry
Species	Human	Mouse
Entrez	6549	226999
Ensembl	ENSG00000115616	ENSMUSG00000026062
UniProt	Q9UBY0	n/a
RefSeq (mRNA)	NM_003048	NM_001033289
RefSeq (protein)	NP_003039	n/a
Location (UCSC)	Chr 2: 102.62 – 102.71 Mb	Chr 1: 40.72 – 40.81 Mb
PubMed search
- Wikidata
View/Edit Human	View/Edit Mouse

Sodium–hydrogen exchanger 2 is a protein that in humans is encoded by the SLC9A2 gene.

== See also ==
- Solute carrier family
