= Peroxisomal membrane protein PMP34 =

Protein found in humans

SLC25A17

Identifiers
- Aliases: SLC25A17, PMP34, solute carrier family 25 member 17
- External IDs: OMIM: 606795; MGI: 1342248; GeneCards: SLC25A17

Gene location (Human)
Chr.	Chromosome 22 (human)
Band	22q13.2	Start	40,769,630 bp
Band	22q13.2	End	40,819,399 bp

Gene location (Mouse)
Chr.	Chromosome 15 (mouse)
Band	15|15 E1	Start	81,203,112 bp
Band	15|15 E1	End	81,245,013 bp
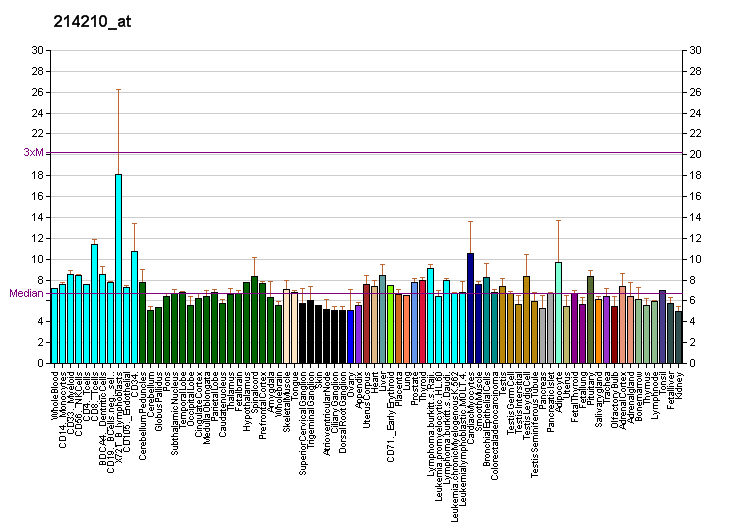

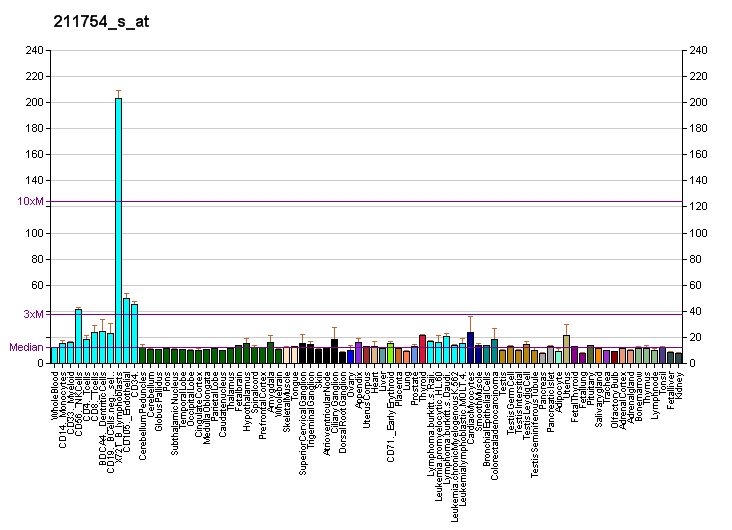
RNA expression pattern
Bgee	Human / Mouse (ortholog); Top expressed in: left ovary; right ovary; islet of Langerhans; body of uterus; ganglionic eminence; right adrenal cortex; gonad; left adrenal gland; ventricular zone; parotid gland / Top expressed in: right kidney; superior surface of tongue; gallbladder; ventricular zone; esophagus; yolk sac; corneal stroma; proximal tubule; choroid plexus of fourth ventricle; lip; More reference expression data
BioGPS	More reference expression data
Gene ontology
Molecular function	chaperone binding; ATP transmembrane transporter activity; AMP transmembrane transporter activity; ADP transmembrane transporter activity; FMN transmembrane transporter activity; coenzyme A transmembrane transporter activity; NAD transmembrane transporter activity; FAD transmembrane transporter activity; protein binding; adenine nucleotide transmembrane transporter activity; transmembrane transporter activity
Cellular component	cytoplasm; integral component of membrane; membrane; peroxisomal membrane; peroxisome; mitochondrion; integral component of peroxisomal membrane; mitochondrial inner membrane
Biological process	ATP transport; fatty acid transport; transmembrane transport; fatty acid alpha-oxidation; fatty acid beta-oxidation; ADP transport; coenzyme A transmembrane transport; NAD transport; AMP transport; FAD transmembrane transport; nucleotide transmembrane transport; mitochondrial transport; transport; NAD transmembrane transport
Sources:Amigo / QuickGO
Orthologs
Databases	NCBI: entry; OMA: entry
Species	Human	Mouse
Entrez	10478	20524
Ensembl	ENSG00000100372	ENSMUSG00000022404
UniProt	O43808	O70579
RefSeq (mRNA)	NM_001282726; NM_001282727; NM_006358	NM_011399
RefSeq (protein)	NP_001269655; NP_001269656; NP_006349	NP_035529
Location (UCSC)	Chr 22: 40.77 – 40.82 Mb	Chr 15: 81.2 – 81.25 Mb
PubMed search
- Wikidata
View/Edit Human	View/Edit Mouse

Peroxisomal membrane protein PMP34 is a protein that in humans is encoded by the SLC25A17 gene.

== Function ==
SLC25A17 is a peroxisomal membrane protein that belongs to the family of mitochondrial solute carriers.[supplied by OMIM]

== See also ==
- Solute carrier family
