= SLC60A1 =

Protein-coding gene in humans

Identifiers
- Aliases: SLC60A1, UNQ3064, MFSD4, major facilitator superfamily domain containing 4A, MFSD4A, Solute carrier family 60 member 1
- External IDs: MGI: 2442786; GeneCards: SLC60A1

Gene location (Human)
Chr.	Chromosome 1 (human)
Band	1q32.1	Start	205,568,885 bp
Band	1q32.1	End	205,602,918 bp

Gene location (Mouse)
Chr.	Chromosome 1 (mouse)
Band	1|1 E4	Start	131,950,544 bp
Band	1|1 E4	End	131,995,800 bp
RNA expression pattern
Bgee	Human / Mouse (ortholog); Top expressed in: palpebral conjunctiva; renal medulla; middle temporal gyrus; Brodmann area 46; nasal epithelium; Brodmann area 23; mucosa of sigmoid colon; endothelial cell; superior frontal gyrus; entorhinal cortex / Top expressed in: epithelium of stomach; left colon; submandibular gland; transitional epithelium of urinary bladder; aortic valve; ascending aorta; parotid gland; olfactory epithelium; cervix; mucous cell of stomach; More reference expression data
BioGPS	n/a
Gene ontology
Molecular function	glucose transmembrane transporter activity
Cellular component	membrane; integral component of membrane
Biological process	transmembrane transport; glucose transmembrane transport
Sources:Amigo / QuickGO
Orthologs
Databases	NCBI: entry; OMA: entry
Species	Human	Mouse
Entrez	148808	213006
Ensembl	ENSG00000174514	ENSMUSG00000059149
UniProt	Q8N468	Q6PDC8
RefSeq (mRNA)	NM_181644	NM_001114662; NM_172510
RefSeq (protein)	NP_857595	NP_001108134; NP_766098
Location (UCSC)	Chr 1: 205.57 – 205.6 Mb	Chr 1: 131.95 – 132 Mb
PubMed search
- Wikidata
View/Edit Human	View/Edit Mouse

Solute carrier family 60 member 1 is a protein that in humans is encoded by the SLC60A1 gene (previously MFSD4). This protein belonging to the MFS Pfam clan. It is an atypical solute carrier, thus a plausible SLC transporter in humans. SLC60A1 has been identified in both central and peripheral areas.
