= Zinc transporter 4 =

Protein found in humans

SLC30A4

Identifiers
- Aliases: SLC30A4, ZNT4, znT-4, solute carrier family 30 member 4
- External IDs: OMIM: 602095; MGI: 1345282; GeneCards: SLC30A4

Gene location (Human)
Chr.	Chromosome 15 (human)
Band	15q21.1|15q21.1	Start	45,479,606 bp
Band	15q21.1|15q21.1	End	45,522,755 bp

Gene location (Mouse)
Chr.	Chromosome 2 (mouse)
Band	2 E5|2 60.65 cM	Start	122,523,153 bp
Band	2 E5|2 60.65 cM	End	122,544,583 bp
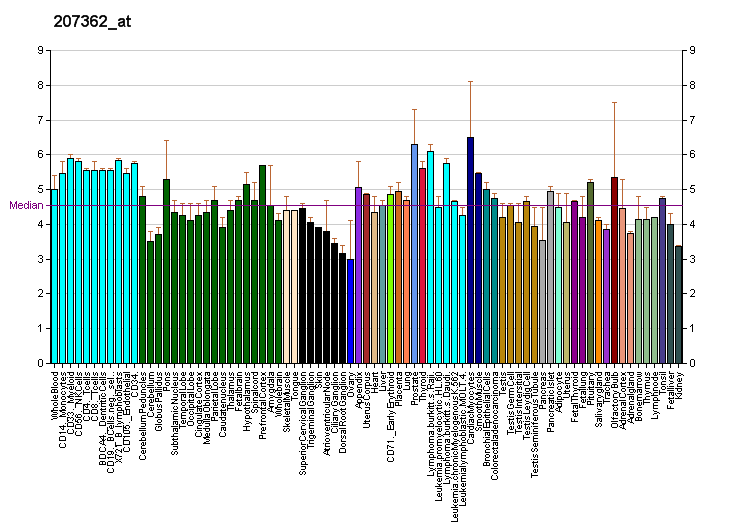
RNA expression pattern
Bgee	Human / Mouse (ortholog); Top expressed in: jejunal mucosa; Brodmann area 23; middle temporal gyrus; oocyte; secondary oocyte; germinal epithelium; endothelial cell; external globus pallidus; synovial joint; gingival epithelium / Top expressed in: jejunum; ileum; uterus; placenta; spermatid; secondary oocyte; genital tubercle; Cortex of frontal lobe; testicle; colon; More reference expression data
BioGPS	More reference expression data
Gene ontology
Molecular function	cation transmembrane transporter activity; zinc ion transmembrane transporter activity; protein binding
Cellular component	cytoplasm; integral component of membrane; endosome; late endosome; membrane; late endosome membrane; lysosomal membrane; lysosome; endosome membrane; plasma membrane
Biological process	zinc ion homeostasis; zinc ion transport; response to zinc ion; cation transport; ion transport; cation transmembrane transport; transmembrane transport; regulation of sequestering of zinc ion; response to toxic substance; zinc ion transmembrane transport
Sources:Amigo / QuickGO
Orthologs
Databases	NCBI: entry; OMA: entry
Species	Human	Mouse
Entrez	7782	22785
Ensembl	ENSG00000104154	ENSMUSG00000005802
UniProt	O14863	O35149
RefSeq (mRNA)	NM_013309; NM_001321036	NM_001290993; NM_011774
RefSeq (protein)	NP_001307965; NP_037441	NP_001277922; NP_035904
Location (UCSC)	Chr 15: 45.48 – 45.52 Mb	Chr 2: 122.52 – 122.54 Mb
PubMed search
- Wikidata
View/Edit Human	View/Edit Mouse

Zinc transporter 4 is a protein that in humans is encoded by the SLC30A4 gene.

== See also ==
- Solute carrier family
