= SLC23A1 =

Mammalian protein found in Homo sapiens

Identifiers
- Aliases: SLC23A1, SLC23A2, SVCT1, YSPL3, solute carrier family 23 member 1
- External IDs: OMIM: 603790; MGI: 1341903; GeneCards: SLC23A1

Gene location (Human)
Chr.	Chromosome 5 (human)
Band	5q31.2	Start	139,367,196 bp
Band	5q31.2	End	139,384,553 bp

Gene location (Mouse)
Chr.	Chromosome 18 (mouse)
Band	18 B2|18 19.17 cM	Start	35,747,657 bp
Band	18 B2|18 19.17 cM	End	35,760,297 bp
RNA expression pattern
Bgee	Human / Mouse (ortholog); Top expressed in: mucosa of ileum; right uterine tube; jejunal mucosa; right lobe of liver; olfactory zone of nasal mucosa; duodenum; mucosa of transverse colon; human kidney; mucosa of paranasal sinus; bronchial epithelial cell / Top expressed in: proximal tubule; right kidney; human kidney; yolk sac; left lobe of liver; lacrimal gland; proximal straight tubule; jejunum; uterus; seminal vesicula; More reference expression data
BioGPS	n/a
Gene ontology
Molecular function	nucleobase transmembrane transporter activity; transporter activity; dehydroascorbic acid transmembrane transporter activity; sodium ion transmembrane transporter activity; protein binding; L-ascorbate:sodium symporter activity; symporter activity; L-ascorbic acid transmembrane transporter activity; transmembrane transporter activity
Cellular component	cytoplasm; integral component of membrane; membrane; plasma membrane; integral component of plasma membrane; basal plasma membrane; apical plasma membrane; intracellular organelle; extracellular exosome; brush border
Biological process	lung development; sodium ion transport; ion transport; L-ascorbic acid transmembrane transport; brain development; nucleobase transport; transmembrane transport; nucleobase-containing compound metabolic process; response to toxic substance; dehydroascorbic acid transport; L-ascorbic acid metabolic process; sodium ion transmembrane transport; transport
Sources:Amigo / QuickGO
Orthologs
Databases	NCBI: entry; OMA: entry
Species	Human	Mouse
Entrez	9963	20522
Ensembl	ENSG00000170482	ENSMUSG00000024354
UniProt	Q9UHI7	Q9Z2J0
RefSeq (mRNA)	NM_005847; NM_152685	NM_011397
RefSeq (protein)	NP_005838; NP_689898	NP_035527
Location (UCSC)	Chr 5: 139.37 – 139.38 Mb	Chr 18: 35.75 – 35.76 Mb
PubMed search
- Wikidata
View/Edit Human	View/Edit Mouse

Solute carrier family 23 member 1 is a protein that in humans is encoded by the SLC23A1 gene.

== Function ==
The absorption of vitamin C into the body and its distribution to organs requires two sodium-dependent vitamin C transporters. This gene encodes one of the two required transporters. The encoded protein is active in bulk vitamin C transport involving epithelial surfaces. Previously, this gene had an official symbol of SLC23A2.

== See also ==
- Solute carrier family
