= Probable low affinity copper uptake protein 2 =

Protein-coding gene in the species Homo sapiens

SLC31A2

Identifiers
- Aliases: SLC31A2, COPT2, CTR2, hCTR2, solute carrier family 31 member 2
- External IDs: OMIM: 603088; MGI: 1333844; GeneCards: SLC31A2

Gene location (Human)
Chr.	Chromosome 9 (human)
Band	9q32	Start	113,150,976 bp
Band	9q32	End	113,164,140 bp

Gene location (Mouse)
Chr.	Chromosome 4 (mouse)
Band	4|4 B3	Start	62,180,799 bp
Band	4|4 B3	End	62,216,648 bp
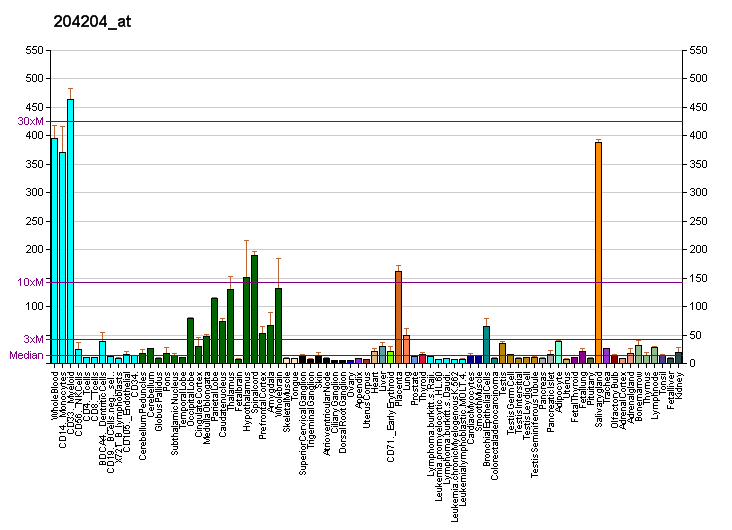
RNA expression pattern
Bgee	Human / Mouse (ortholog); Top expressed in: parotid gland; inferior ganglion of vagus nerve; C1 segment; corpus callosum; pons; subthalamic nucleus; medulla oblongata; monocyte; superior vestibular nucleus; decidua / Top expressed in: lacrimal gland; seminal vesicula; parotid gland; neural layer of retina; granulocyte; spermatid; submandibular gland; renal corpuscle; lip; gastrula; More reference expression data
BioGPS	More reference expression data
Gene ontology
Molecular function	copper ion transmembrane transporter activity
Cellular component	integral component of membrane; recycling endosome; late endosome; integral component of plasma membrane; membrane; plasma membrane
Biological process	copper ion transport; ion transport; copper ion transmembrane transport; regulation of copper ion transmembrane transport; cellular copper ion homeostasis
Sources:Amigo / QuickGO
Orthologs
Databases	NCBI: entry; OMA: entry
Species	Human	Mouse
Entrez	1318	20530
Ensembl	ENSG00000136867	ENSMUSG00000066152
UniProt	O15432	Q9CPU9
RefSeq (mRNA)	NM_001860	NM_001290518; NM_025286
RefSeq (protein)	NP_001851	NP_001277447; NP_079562
Location (UCSC)	Chr 9: 113.15 – 113.16 Mb	Chr 4: 62.18 – 62.22 Mb
PubMed search
- Wikidata
View/Edit Human	View/Edit Mouse

Probable low affinity copper uptake protein 2 is a protein that in humans is encoded by the SLC31A2 gene.

== See also ==
- Solute carrier family
