= SLC15A2 =

Protein-coding gene in the species Homo sapiens

Identifiers
- Aliases: SLC15A2, PEPT2, solute carrier family 15 member 2
- External IDs: OMIM: 602339; MGI: 1890457; GeneCards: SLC15A2

Gene location (Human)
Chr.	Chromosome 3 (human)
Band	3q13.33	Start	121,894,401 bp
Band	3q13.33	End	121,944,188 bp

Gene location (Mouse)
Chr.	Chromosome 16 (mouse)
Band	16|16 B3	Start	36,570,539 bp
Band	16|16 B3	End	36,605,324 bp
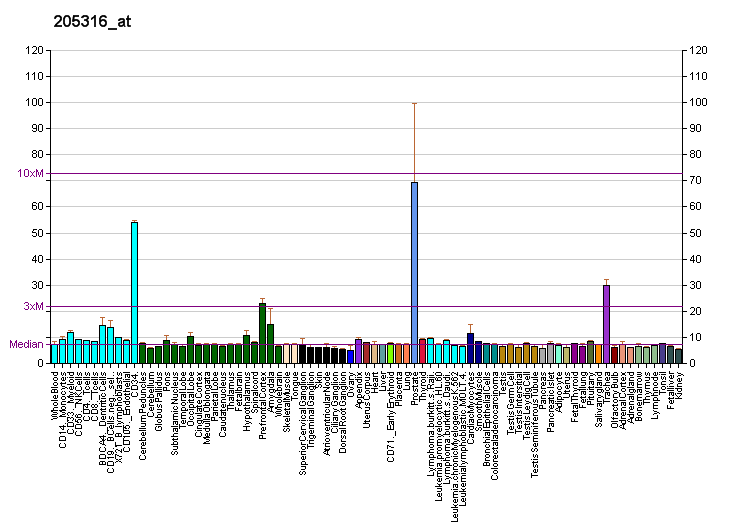

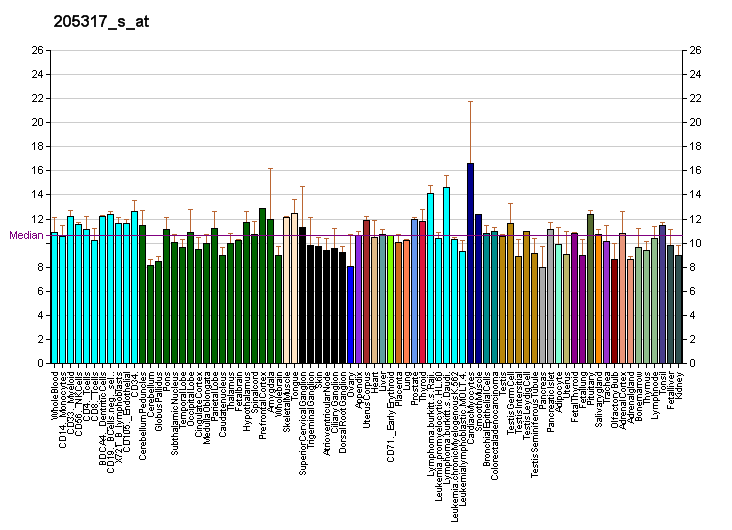
RNA expression pattern
Bgee	Human / Mouse (ortholog); Top expressed in: nasal epithelium; bronchial epithelial cell; palpebral conjunctiva; corpus epididymis; mucosa of paranasal sinus; parotid gland; olfactory zone of nasal mucosa; seminal vesicula; trachea; epithelium of nasopharynx / Top expressed in: epithelium of lens; conjunctival fornix; olfactory epithelium; right kidney; vestibular membrane of cochlear duct; human kidney; neural layer of retina; parotid gland; Epithelium of choroid plexus; seminal vesicula; More reference expression data
BioGPS	More reference expression data
Gene ontology
Molecular function	peptide:proton symporter activity; protein binding; symporter activity; transporter activity; transmembrane transporter activity; oligopeptide transmembrane transporter activity; dipeptide transmembrane transporter activity; peptide transmembrane transporter activity
Cellular component	integral component of membrane; plasma membrane; integral component of plasma membrane; extracellular exosome; membrane
Biological process	protein transport; peptide transport; oligopeptide transport; ion transport; transmembrane transport; transport; dipeptide transmembrane transport; oligopeptide transmembrane transport; proton transmembrane transport; xenobiotic detoxification by transmembrane export across the plasma membrane
Sources:Amigo / QuickGO
Orthologs
Databases	NCBI: entry; OMA: entry
Species	Human	Mouse
Entrez	6565	57738
Ensembl	ENSG00000163406	ENSMUSG00000022899
UniProt	Q16348	Q9ES07
RefSeq (mRNA)	NM_001145998; NM_021082	NM_001145899; NM_021301
RefSeq (protein)	NP_001139470; NP_066568	n/a
Location (UCSC)	Chr 3: 121.89 – 121.94 Mb	Chr 16: 36.57 – 36.61 Mb
PubMed search
- Wikidata
View/Edit Human	View/Edit Mouse

Solute carrier family 15 (H+/peptide transporter), member 2, also known as SLC15A2, is a human gene.

== See also ==
- Solute carrier family
