= Sodium/hydrogen exchanger 5 =

Protein-coding gene in the species Homo sapiens

SLC9A5

Identifiers
- Aliases: SLC9A5, NHE5, solute carrier family 9 member A5
- External IDs: OMIM: 600477; MGI: 2685542; GeneCards: SLC9A5

Gene location (Human)
Chr.	Chromosome 16 (human)
Band	16q22.1	Start	67,237,683 bp
Band	16q22.1	End	67,272,191 bp

Gene location (Mouse)
Chr.	Chromosome 8 (mouse)
Band	8|8 D3	Start	105,348,843 bp
Band	8|8 D3	End	105,369,881 bp
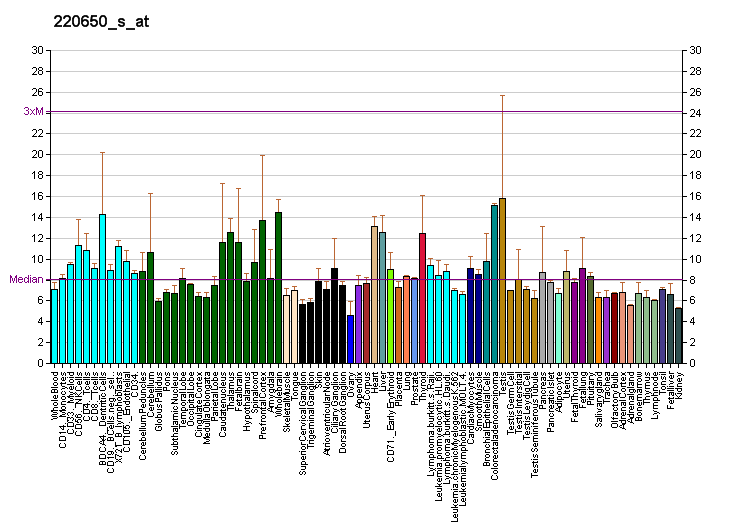
RNA expression pattern
Bgee	Human / Mouse (ortholog); Top expressed in: right hemisphere of cerebellum; spleen; stromal cell of endometrium; nucleus accumbens; putamen; caudate nucleus; cerebellar vermis; testicle; right frontal lobe; dorsal motor nucleus of vagus nerve / Top expressed in: spermatocyte; superior frontal gyrus; cerebellar cortex; neural layer of retina; primary visual cortex; lumbar subsegment of spinal cord; seminiferous tubule; tail of embryo; ventricular zone; cerebellar vermis; More reference expression data
BioGPS	More reference expression data
Gene ontology
Molecular function	solute:proton antiporter activity; antiporter activity; potassium:proton antiporter activity; sodium:proton antiporter activity
Cellular component	membrane; integral component of membrane; plasma membrane
Biological process	regulation of pH; ion transport; proton transmembrane transport; sodium ion transport; cation transport; regulation of intracellular pH; sodium ion import across plasma membrane; potassium ion transmembrane transport; transmembrane transport; anion transmembrane transport
Sources:Amigo / QuickGO
Orthologs
Databases	NCBI: entry; OMA: entry
Species	Human	Mouse
Entrez	6553	277973
Ensembl	ENSG00000135740	ENSMUSG00000014786
UniProt	Q14940	B2RXE2
RefSeq (mRNA)	NM_004594; NM_001323971; NM_001323972; NM_001323973; NM_001323974 NM_001323975	NM_001081332
RefSeq (protein)	NP_001310900; NP_001310901; NP_001310902; NP_001310903; NP_001310904 NP_004585	NP_001074801
Location (UCSC)	Chr 16: 67.24 – 67.27 Mb	Chr 8: 105.35 – 105.37 Mb
PubMed search
- Wikidata
View/Edit Human	View/Edit Mouse

Sodium/hydrogen exchanger 5 is a protein that in humans is encoded by the SLC9A5 gene.

== See also ==
- Solute carrier family
