= SFXN4 =

Protein-coding gene in the species Homo sapiens

Identifiers
- Aliases: SFXN4, BCRM1, COXPD18, sideroflexin 4, SLC56A4
- External IDs: OMIM: 615564; MGI: 2137680; GeneCards: SFXN4

Gene location (Human)
Chr.	Chromosome 10 (human)
Band	10q26.11	Start	119,140,767 bp
Band	10q26.11	End	119,165,714 bp

Gene location (Mouse)
Chr.	Chromosome 19 (mouse)
Band	19|19 D3	Start	60,825,715 bp
Band	19|19 D3	End	60,849,917 bp
RNA expression pattern
Bgee	Human / Mouse (ortholog); Top expressed in: apex of heart; tibialis anterior muscle; right adrenal cortex; body of pancreas; muscle of thigh; mucosa of transverse colon; right uterine tube; gastrocnemius muscle; left adrenal gland; deltoid muscle / Top expressed in: Region I of hippocampus proper; neural layer of retina; lumbar spinal ganglion; facial motor nucleus; visual cortex; primary visual cortex; dentate gyrus of hippocampal formation granule cell; superior frontal gyrus; suprachiasmatic nucleus; dorsal tegmental nucleus; More reference expression data
BioGPS	n/a
Gene ontology
Molecular function	ion transmembrane transporter activity
Cellular component	integral component of membrane; mitochondrial inner membrane; mitochondrion; membrane; intracellular membrane-bounded organelle
Biological process	ion transmembrane transport; iron ion homeostasis; ion transport; transmembrane transport; amino acid transport
Sources:Amigo / QuickGO
Orthologs
Databases	NCBI: entry; OMA: entry
Species	Human	Mouse
Entrez	119559	94281
Ensembl	ENSG00000183605	ENSMUSG00000063698
UniProt	Q6P4A7	Q925N1
RefSeq (mRNA)	NM_178867; NM_213649	NM_053198; NM_001362384; NM_001362385
RefSeq (protein)	NP_998814	NP_444428; NP_001349313; NP_001349314
Location (UCSC)	Chr 10: 119.14 – 119.17 Mb	Chr 19: 60.83 – 60.85 Mb
PubMed search
- Wikidata
View/Edit Human	View/Edit Mouse

Sideroflexin-4 is a protein that in humans is encoded by the SFXN4 gene. Sideroflexin-4 is a membrane transporter that belongs to solute carrier family 56. It is associated with mitochondrial transmembrane transport and amino acid transport, where it is required for mitochondrial respiratory homeostasis.
