= LETM2 =

Protein-coding gene in the species Homo sapiens

Identifiers
- Aliases: LETM2, leucine zipper and EF-hand containing transmembrane protein 2, SLC55A2
- External IDs: MGI: 2444979; GeneCards: LETM2

Gene location (Human)
Chr.	Chromosome 8 (human)
Band	8p11.23	Start	38,386,207 bp
Band	8p11.23	End	38,409,527 bp

Gene location (Mouse)
Chr.	Chromosome 8 (mouse)
Band	8|8 A2	Start	26,068,506 bp
Band	8|8 A2	End	26,087,598 bp
RNA expression pattern
Bgee	Human / Mouse (ortholog); Top expressed in: left testis; right testis; cerebellar hemisphere; right hemisphere of cerebellum; secondary oocyte; islet of Langerhans; Descending thoracic aorta; anterior pituitary; stromal cell of endometrium; testicle / Top expressed in: spermatid; seminiferous tubule; spermatocyte; neural layer of retina; granulocyte; zygote; muscle of thigh; cerebellar cortex; otolith organ; facial motor nucleus; More reference expression data
BioGPS	n/a
Gene ontology
Molecular function	ribosome binding
Cellular component	membrane; mitochondrion; integral component of membrane; mitochondrial inner membrane
Biological process	cellular metal ion homeostasis
Sources:Amigo / QuickGO
Orthologs
Databases	NCBI: entry; OMA: entry
Species	Human	Mouse
Entrez	137994	270035
Ensembl	ENSG00000165046	ENSMUSG00000037363
UniProt	Q2VYF4	Q7TNU7
RefSeq (mRNA)	NM_001199659; NM_001199660; NM_001286787; NM_001286819; NM_001286821 NM_144652; NM_001330515; NM_001363204; NM_001363205	NM_173012; NM_001364069; NM_001364070; NM_001364071
RefSeq (protein)	NP_001186588; NP_001186589; NP_001273716; NP_001273748; NP_001273750 NP_001317444; NP_653253; NP_001350133; NP_001350134	NP_766600; NP_001350998; NP_001350999; NP_001351000
Location (UCSC)	Chr 8: 38.39 – 38.41 Mb	Chr 8: 26.07 – 26.09 Mb
PubMed search
- Wikidata
View/Edit Human	View/Edit Mouse

LETM2, also known as Leucine Zipper And EF-Hand Containing Transmembrane Protein 2, is a protein that in humans is encoded by the LETM2 gene. LETM2 is a mitochondrial membrane transporter that belongs to solute carrier family 55. It is predicted to be involved in mitochondrial calcium ion transmembrane transport and mitochondrion organization. Diseases associated with LETM2 include Wolf-Hirschhorn Syndrome.
