= Monocarboxylate transporter 5 =

Protein found in humans

SLC16A4

Identifiers
- Aliases: SLC16A4, MCT4, MCT5, solute carrier family 16 member 4
- External IDs: OMIM: 603878; MGI: 2385183; GeneCards: SLC16A4

Gene location (Human)
| Chr. | Chromosome 1 (human) |
| Band | 1p13.3 | Start | 110,362,851 bp |
| Band | 1p13.3 | End | 110,391,082 bp |

Gene location (Mouse)
| Chr. | Chromosome 3 (mouse) |
| Band | 3|3 F2.3 | Start | 107,198,546 bp |
| Band | 3|3 F2.3 | End | 107,219,431 bp |
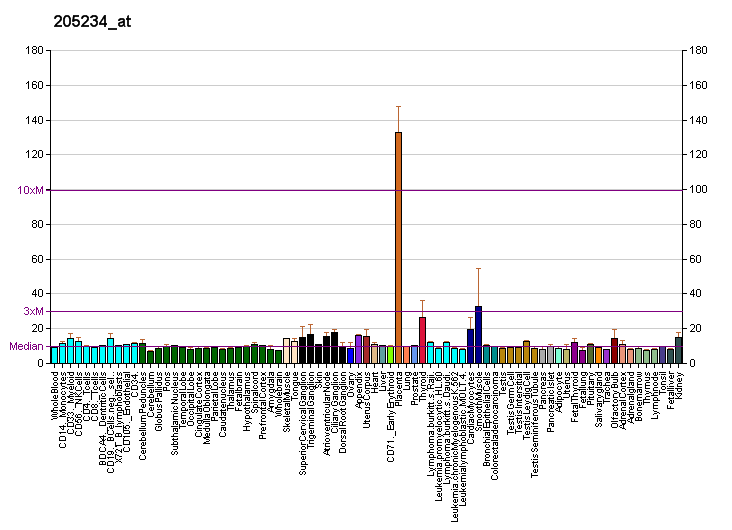
RNA expression pattern
| Bgee | Human / Mouse (ortholog); Top expressed in: palpebral conjunctiva; kidney tubule; glomerulus; metanephric glomerulus; retinal pigment epithelium; corpus epididymis; placenta; caput epididymis; jejunal mucosa; human kidney / Top expressed in: right kidney; human kidney; proximal tubule; calvaria; Epithelium of choroid plexus; spermatocyte; tail of embryo; ventricular zone; neural layer of retina; embryo; More reference expression data |
| BioGPS | More reference expression data |
Gene ontology
| Molecular function | symporter activity; monocarboxylic acid transmembrane transporter activity |
| Cellular component | integral component of membrane; plasma membrane; integral component of plasma membrane; membrane |
| Biological process | monocarboxylic acid transport; transmembrane transport |
Sources:Amigo / QuickGO
Orthologs
| Databases | NCBI: entry; OMA: entry |
| Species | Human | Mouse |
| Entrez | 9122 | 229699 |
| Ensembl | ENSG00000168679 | ENSMUSG00000027896 |
| UniProt | O15374 | Q8R0M8 |
| RefSeq (mRNA) | NM_001201546; NM_001201547; NM_001201548; NM_001201549; NM_004696 NM_001319220 | NM_146136; NM_001310705 |
| RefSeq (protein) | NP_001188475; NP_001188476; NP_001188477; NP_001188478; NP_001306149 NP_004687 | NP_001297634; NP_666248 |
| Location (UCSC) | Chr 1: 110.36 – 110.39 Mb | Chr 3: 107.2 – 107.22 Mb |
| PubMed search |
- Wikidata
| View/Edit Human | View/Edit Mouse |

Monocarboxylate transporter 5 is a protein that in humans is encoded by the SLC16A4 gene.

== See also ==
- Solute carrier family
