= Sodium/hydrogen exchanger 8 =

Protein-coding gene in the species Homo sapiens

SLC9A8

Identifiers
- Aliases: SLC9A8, NHE-8, NHE8, solute carrier family 9 member A8
- External IDs: OMIM: 612730; MGI: 1924281; GeneCards: SLC9A8

Gene location (Human)
Chr.	Chromosome 20 (human)
Band	20q13.13	Start	49,812,713 bp
Band	20q13.13	End	49,892,242 bp

Gene location (Mouse)
Chr.	Chromosome 2 (mouse)
Band	2|2 H3	Start	167,421,712 bp
Band	2|2 H3	End	167,477,000 bp
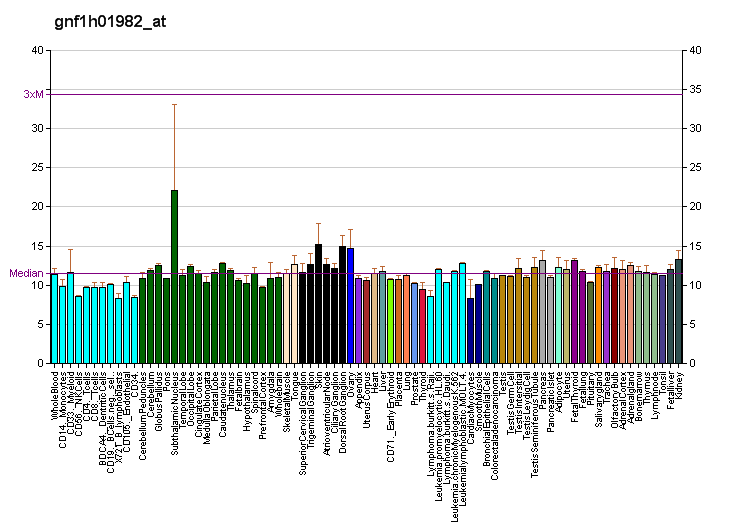

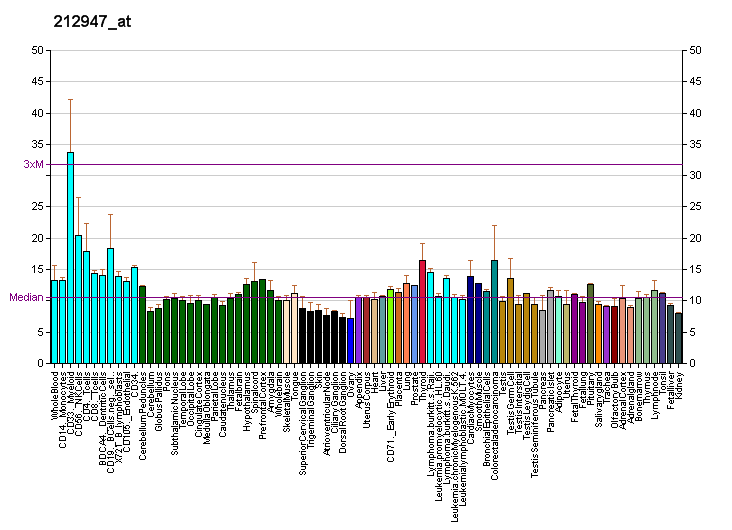
RNA expression pattern
Bgee	Human / Mouse (ortholog); Top expressed in: blood; granulocyte; gastrocnemius muscle; nasal epithelium; gonad; spleen; muscle of thigh; right lobe of liver; gastric mucosa; bone marrow cell / Top expressed in: right kidney; Rostral migratory stream; Ileal epithelium; proximal tubule; muscle of thigh; genital tubercle; tail of embryo; yolk sac; spermatocyte; human kidney; More reference expression data
BioGPS	More reference expression data
Gene ontology
Molecular function	solute:proton antiporter activity; antiporter activity; sodium:proton antiporter activity; potassium:proton antiporter activity
Cellular component	integral component of membrane; Golgi membrane; membrane; plasma membrane; Golgi apparatus
Biological process	proton transmembrane transport; potassium ion transport; cation transport; ion transport; sodium ion transmembrane transport; regulation of pH; sodium ion transport; regulation of intracellular pH; sodium ion import across plasma membrane; potassium ion transmembrane transport; transmembrane transport; anion transmembrane transport
Sources:Amigo / QuickGO
Orthologs
Databases	NCBI: entry; OMA: entry
Species	Human	Mouse
Entrez	23315	77031
Ensembl	ENSG00000197818	ENSMUSG00000039463
UniProt	Q9Y2E8	Q8R4D1
RefSeq (mRNA)	NM_001260491; NM_015266	NM_148929; NM_178371; NM_001304540; NM_001304542
RefSeq (protein)	NP_001247420; NP_056081	NP_001291469; NP_001291471; NP_683731
Location (UCSC)	Chr 20: 49.81 – 49.89 Mb	Chr 2: 167.42 – 167.48 Mb
PubMed search
- Wikidata
View/Edit Human	View/Edit Mouse

Sodium/hydrogen exchanger 8 is a protein that in humans is encoded by the SLC9A8 gene.

== See also ==
- Solute carrier family
