= SLCO2B1 =

Protein-coding gene in the species Homo sapiens

Identifiers
- Aliases: SLCO2B1, OATP-B, OATP2B1, OATPB, SLC21A9, solute carrier organic anion transporter family member 2B1
- External IDs: OMIM: 604988; MGI: 1351872; GeneCards: SLCO2B1

Gene location (Human)
Chr.	Chromosome 11 (human)
Band	11q13.4	Start	75,100,563 bp
Band	11q13.4	End	75,206,549 bp

Gene location (Mouse)
Chr.	Chromosome 7 (mouse)
Band	7|7 E1	Start	99,307,011 bp
Band	7|7 E1	End	99,360,547 bp
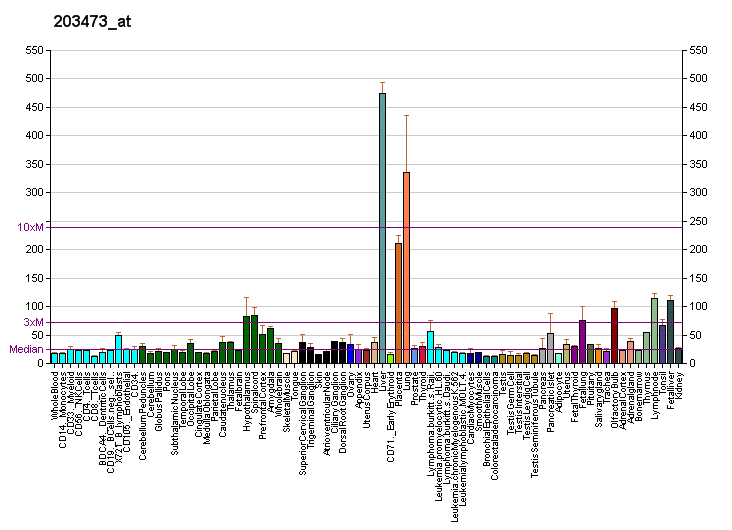

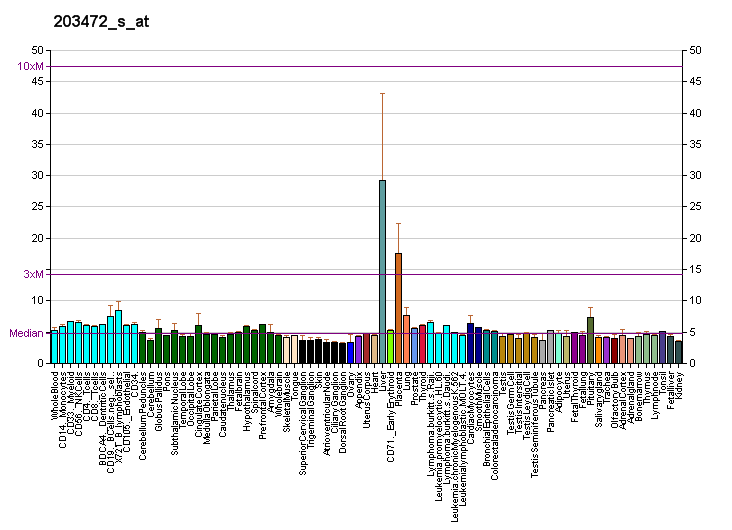

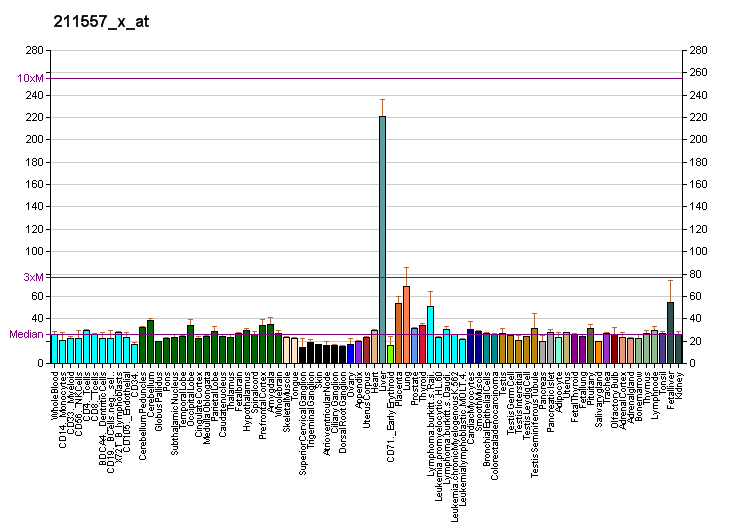
RNA expression pattern
Bgee	Human / Mouse (ortholog); Top expressed in: right lobe of liver; sural nerve; upper lobe of left lung; C1 segment; lymph node; spleen; mucosa of ileum; gallbladder; right adrenal cortex; appendix / Top expressed in: left lobe of liver; mesenteric lymph nodes; sciatic nerve; lumbar subsegment of spinal cord; subcutaneous adipose tissue; white adipose tissue; spleen; skin of abdomen; stroma of bone marrow; extraocular muscle; More reference expression data
BioGPS	More reference expression data
Gene ontology
Molecular function	organic anion transmembrane transporter activity; transporter activity; sodium-independent organic anion transmembrane transporter activity; bile acid transmembrane transporter activity
Cellular component	integral component of membrane; plasma membrane; membrane; integral component of plasma membrane
Biological process	ion transport; bile acid and bile salt transport; sodium-independent organic anion transport; transmembrane transport; transport
Sources:Amigo / QuickGO
Orthologs
Databases	NCBI: entry; OMA: entry
Species	Human	Mouse
Entrez	11309	101488
Ensembl	ENSG00000137491	ENSMUSG00000030737
UniProt	O94956	Q8BXB6
RefSeq (mRNA)	NM_007256; NM_001145211; NM_001145212	NM_001252530; NM_001252531; NM_175316
RefSeq (protein)	NP_001138683; NP_001138684; NP_009187	NP_001239459; NP_001239460; NP_780525
Location (UCSC)	Chr 11: 75.1 – 75.21 Mb	Chr 7: 99.31 – 99.36 Mb
PubMed search
- Wikidata
View/Edit Human	View/Edit Mouse

Solute carrier organic anion transporter family member 2B1 also known as organic anion-transporting polypeptide 2B1 (OATP2B1) is a protein that in humans is encoded by the gene SLCO2B1.

== See also ==
- Solute carrier family
