= SLC23A2 =

Protein-coding gene in the species Homo sapiens

Identifiers
- Aliases: SLC23A2, NBTL1, SLC23A1, SVCT2, YSPL2, hSVCT2, solute carrier family 23 member 2
- External IDs: OMIM: 603791; MGI: 1859682; GeneCards: SLC23A2

Gene location (Human)
Chr.	Chromosome 20 (human)
Band	20p13	Start	4,852,356 bp
Band	20p13	End	5,010,293 bp

Gene location (Mouse)
Chr.	Chromosome 2 (mouse)
Band	2|2 F2	Start	131,894,416 bp
Band	2|2 F2	End	131,987,028 bp
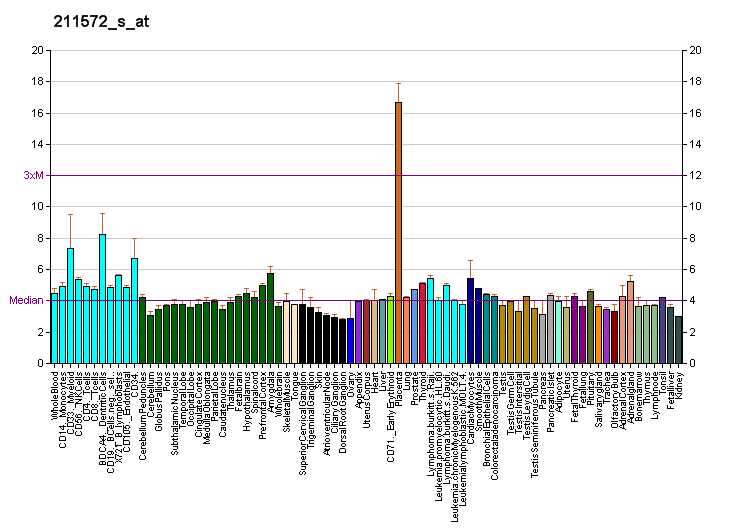

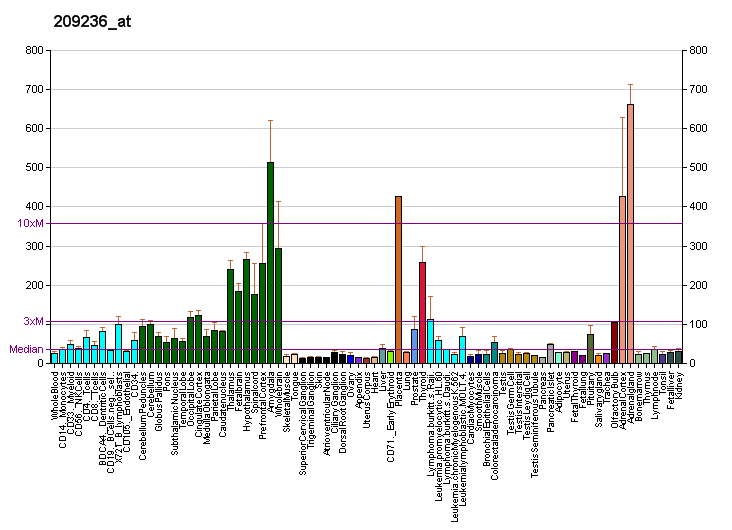

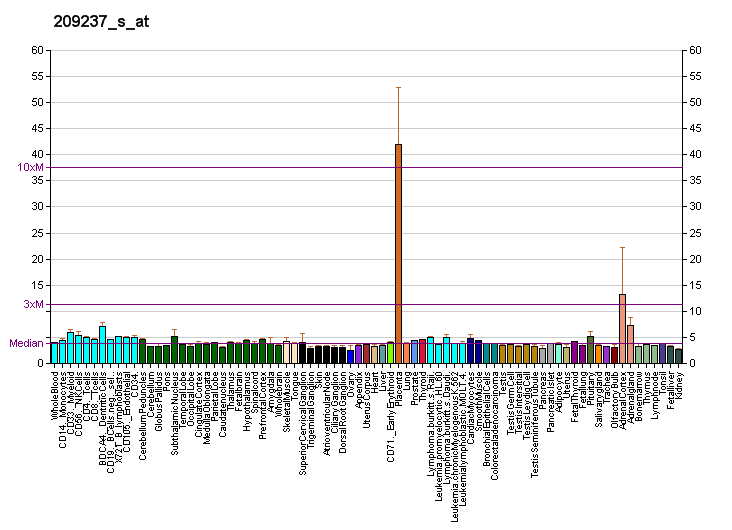
RNA expression pattern
Bgee	Human / Mouse (ortholog); Top expressed in: right adrenal cortex; left adrenal cortex; lateral nuclear group of thalamus; Brodmann area 10; Epithelium of choroid plexus; paraflocculus of cerebellum; cerebellar vermis; pars compacta; right lobe of liver; subthalamic nucleus / Top expressed in: choroid plexus of fourth ventricle; secondary oocyte; gastrula; zygote; primary visual cortex; perirhinal cortex; CA3 field; entorhinal cortex; Epithelium of choroid plexus; superior frontal gyrus; More reference expression data
BioGPS	More reference expression data
Gene ontology
Molecular function	nucleobase transmembrane transporter activity; transporter activity; L-ascorbate:sodium symporter activity; symporter activity; L-ascorbic acid transmembrane transporter activity; transmembrane transporter activity
Cellular component	cytoplasm; membrane; basal plasma membrane; basolateral plasma membrane; apical plasma membrane; plasma membrane; integral component of plasma membrane; integral component of membrane; contractile fiber
Biological process	sodium ion transport; ion transport; response to oxidative stress; L-ascorbic acid transmembrane transport; nucleobase transport; transmembrane transport; nucleobase-containing compound metabolic process; L-ascorbic acid metabolic process
Sources:Amigo / QuickGO
Orthologs
Databases	NCBI: entry; OMA: entry
Species	Human	Mouse
Entrez	9962	54338
Ensembl	ENSG00000089057	ENSMUSG00000027340
UniProt	Q9UGH3	Q9EPR4
RefSeq (mRNA)	NM_005116; NM_203327	NM_018824; NM_001355430; NM_001355431
RefSeq (protein)	NP_005107; NP_976072	NP_061294; NP_001342359; NP_001342360
Location (UCSC)	Chr 20: 4.85 – 5.01 Mb	Chr 2: 131.89 – 131.99 Mb
PubMed search
- Wikidata
View/Edit Human	View/Edit Mouse

Solute carrier family 23 member 2 is a protein that in humans is encoded by the SLC23A2 gene.

The absorption of vitamin C into the body and its distribution to organs requires two sodium-dependent vitamin C transporters. This gene encodes one of the two required transporters and the encoded protein accounts for tissue-specific uptake of vitamin C. Previously, this gene had an official symbol of SLC23A1.

== See also ==
- Solute carrier family
