= Adenosine 3'-phospho 5'-phosphosulfate transporter 1 =

Protein found in humans

SLC35B2

Identifiers
- Aliases: SLC35B2, PAPST1, SLL, UGTrel4, solute carrier family 35 member B2
- External IDs: OMIM: 610788; MGI: 1921086; GeneCards: SLC35B2

Gene location (Human)
Chr.	Chromosome 6 (human)
Band	6p21.1	Start	44,254,096 bp
Band	6p21.1	End	44,257,890 bp

Gene location (Mouse)
Chr.	Chromosome 17 (mouse)
Band	17|17 B3	Start	45,874,800 bp
Band	17|17 B3	End	45,878,597 bp
RNA expression pattern
Bgee	Human / Mouse (ortholog); Top expressed in: stromal cell of endometrium; gonad; islet of Langerhans; right adrenal cortex; left adrenal cortex; gallbladder; ventricular zone; apex of heart; body of pancreas; mucosa of transverse colon / Top expressed in: right kidney; saccule; ventricular zone; salivary gland; lacrimal gland; otic vesicle; ankle joint; proximal tubule; lip; optic nerve; More reference expression data
BioGPS	n/a
Gene ontology
Molecular function	signal transducer activity; 3'-phosphoadenosine 5'-phosphosulfate transmembrane transporter activity
Cellular component	integral component of membrane; Golgi membrane; Golgi apparatus; membrane; integral component of Golgi membrane; integral component of endoplasmic reticulum membrane
Biological process	positive regulation of I-kappaB kinase/NF-kappaB signaling; 3'-phosphoadenosine 5'-phosphosulfate biosynthetic process; 3'-phosphoadenosine 5'-phosphosulfate transport; signal transduction; transmembrane transport; 3'-phospho-5'-adenylyl sulfate transmembrane transport; transport
Sources:Amigo / QuickGO
Orthologs
Databases	NCBI: entry; OMA: entry
Species	Human	Mouse
Entrez	347734	73836
Ensembl	ENSG00000157593	ENSMUSG00000037089
UniProt	Q8TB61	Q91ZN5
RefSeq (mRNA)	NM_178148; NM_001286509; NM_001286510; NM_001286511; NM_001286512 NM_001286513; NM_001286517; NM_001286519; NM_001286520	NM_028662; NM_001357105
RefSeq (protein)	NP_001273438; NP_001273439; NP_001273440; NP_001273441; NP_001273442 NP_001273446; NP_001273448; NP_001273449; NP_835361	NP_001344034
Location (UCSC)	Chr 6: 44.25 – 44.26 Mb	Chr 17: 45.87 – 45.88 Mb
PubMed search
- Wikidata
View/Edit Human	View/Edit Mouse

Adenosine 3'-phospho 5'-phosphosulfate transporter 1 is a protein that in humans is encoded by the SLC35B2 gene.

== See also ==
- Solute carrier family
