= MPC1L =

Protein-coding gene in the species Homo sapiens

Identifiers
- Aliases: MPC1L, mitochondrial pyruvate carrier 1-like, mitochondrial pyruvate carrier 1 like, SLC54A3
- External IDs: GeneCards: MPC1L

Gene location (Human)
Chr.	X chromosome (human)
Band	Xp11.4	Start	40,623,428 bp
Band	Xp11.4	End	40,624,136 bp
RNA expression pattern
Bgee	Human / Mouse (ortholog); Top expressed in: gonad; testicle; left testis; right testis; granulocyte; stromal cell of endometrium; right coronary artery; muscle of thigh; placenta; islet of Langerhans / n/a; More reference expression data
BioGPS	n/a
Gene ontology
Molecular function	pyruvate transmembrane transporter activity
Cellular component	membrane; integral component of membrane; mitochondrial inner membrane; integral component of mitochondrial inner membrane
Biological process	mitochondrial pyruvate transmembrane transport
Sources:Amigo / QuickGO
Orthologs
Databases	NCBI: entry; OMA: entry
Species	Human	Mouse
Entrez	347411	n/a
Ensembl	ENSG00000238205	n/a
UniProt	P0DKB6	n/a
RefSeq (mRNA)	NM_001195522	n/a
RefSeq (protein)	NP_001182451	n/a
Location (UCSC)	Chr X: 40.62 – 40.62 Mb	n/a
PubMed search		n/a
- Wikidata
View/Edit Human

Mitochondrial Pyruvate Carrier 1 Like (MPC1L) is a protein that in humans is encoded by the MPC1L gene. MPC1L is a mitochondrial pyruvate carrier that belongs to solute carrier family 54. It is associated with mitochondrial pyruvate transmembrane transport, where it connects cytosolic pyruvate availability with mitochondrial pyruvate metabolism.
