= Anion exchange transporter =

Protein-coding gene in the species Homo sapiens

SLC26A7

Identifiers
- Aliases: SLC26A7, SUT2, solute carrier family 26 member 7
- External IDs: OMIM: 608479; MGI: 2384791; GeneCards: SLC26A7

Gene location (Human)
Chr.	Chromosome 8 (human)
Band	8q21.3	Start	91,209,494 bp
Band	8q21.3	End	91,398,155 bp

Gene location (Mouse)
Chr.	Chromosome 4 (mouse)
Band	4|4 A1	Start	14,502,430 bp
Band	4|4 A1	End	14,621,805 bp
RNA expression pattern
Bgee	Human / Mouse (ortholog); Top expressed in: thyroid gland; right lobe of thyroid gland; left lobe of thyroid gland; retinal pigment epithelium; renal medulla; human kidney; testicle; endometrium; lymph node; placenta / Top expressed in: vestibular membrane of cochlear duct; retinal pigment epithelium; ciliary body; iris; olfactory epithelium; renal corpuscle; vestibular sensory epithelium; pineal gland; lumbar spinal ganglion; molar; More reference expression data
BioGPS	n/a
Gene ontology
Molecular function	anion channel activity; anion transmembrane transporter activity; sulfate transmembrane transporter activity; secondary active sulfate transmembrane transporter activity; bicarbonate transmembrane transporter activity; oxalate transmembrane transporter activity; chloride channel activity; chloride transmembrane transporter activity
Cellular component	cytoplasm; integral component of membrane; endosome; membrane; plasma membrane; integral component of plasma membrane; recycling endosome membrane; basolateral plasma membrane
Biological process	oxalate transport; sulfate transport; gastric acid secretion; regulation of membrane potential; regulation of intracellular pH; ion transport; anion transport; bicarbonate transport; chloride transport; chloride transmembrane transport; anion transmembrane transport; sulfate transmembrane transport; transmembrane transport
Sources:Amigo / QuickGO
Orthologs
Databases	NCBI: entry; OMA: entry
Species	Human	Mouse
Entrez	115111	208890
Ensembl	ENSG00000147606	ENSMUSG00000040569
UniProt	Q8TE54	Q8R2Z3
RefSeq (mRNA)	NM_134266; NM_001282356; NM_001282357; NM_052832	NM_145947
RefSeq (protein)	NP_001269285; NP_001269286; NP_439897; NP_599028	NP_666059
Location (UCSC)	Chr 8: 91.21 – 91.4 Mb	Chr 4: 14.5 – 14.62 Mb
PubMed search
- Wikidata
View/Edit Human	View/Edit Mouse

Anion exchange transporter is a protein that in humans is encoded by the SLC26A7 gene.

== Function ==
This gene is one member of a family of sulfate/anion transporter genes. Family members are well conserved in their genomic (number and size of exons) and protein (aa length among species) structures yet have markedly different tissue expression patterns. This gene has abundant and specific expression in the kidney. Splice variants that use both alternate transcription initiation and polyadenylation sites have been described for this gene.

== See also ==
- Solute carrier family
