= UDP-galactose translocator =

Protein found in humans

SLC35A2

Identifiers
- Aliases: SLC35A2, CDG2M, CDGX, UDP-Gal-Tr, UGALT, UGAT, UGT, UGT1, UGT2, UGTL, solute carrier family 35 member A2
- External IDs: OMIM: 314375; MGI: 1345297; GeneCards: SLC35A2

Gene location (Human)
Chr.	X chromosome (human)
Band	Xp11.23	Start	48,903,180 bp
Band	Xp11.23	End	48,911,958 bp

Gene location (Mouse)
Chr.	X chromosome (mouse)
Band	X A1.1|X 3.56 cM	Start	7,750,267 bp
Band	X A1.1|X 3.56 cM	End	7,760,731 bp
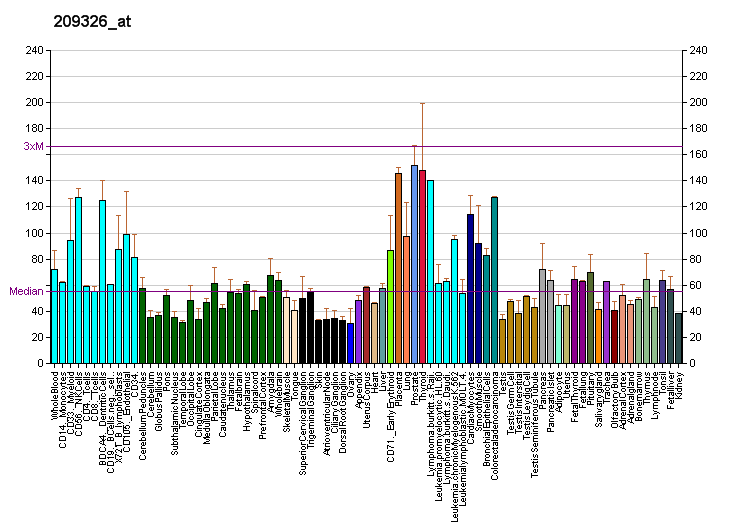

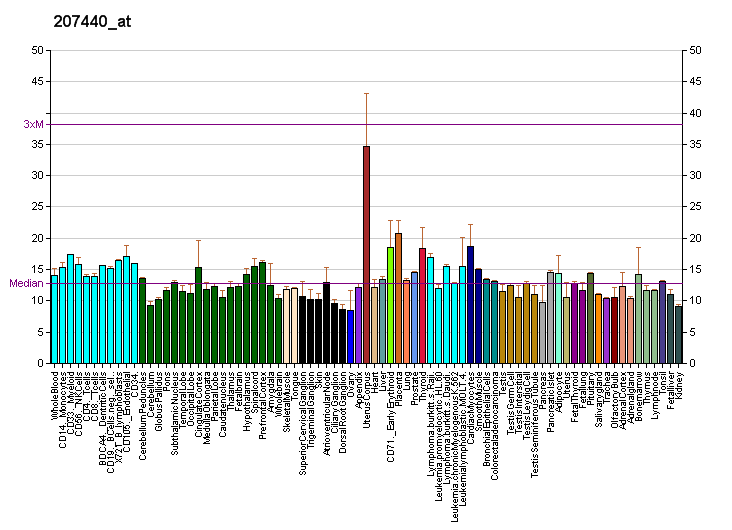

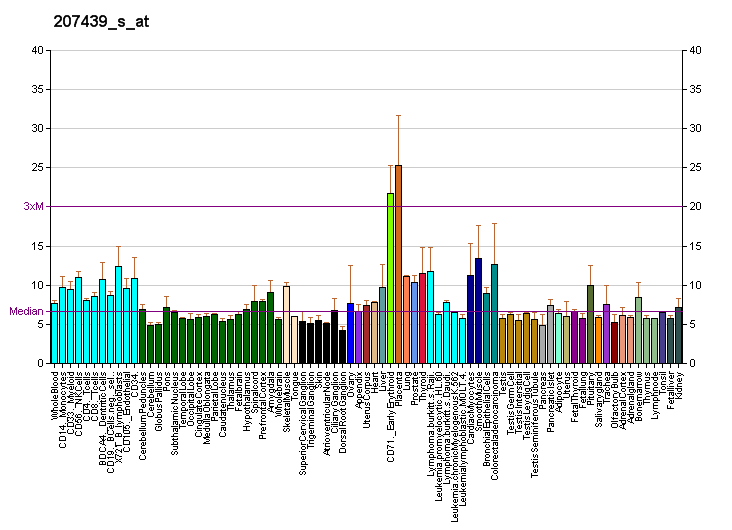
RNA expression pattern
Bgee	Human / Mouse (ortholog); Top expressed in: secondary oocyte; bronchial epithelial cell; palpebral conjunctiva; stromal cell of endometrium; mucosa of transverse colon; olfactory zone of nasal mucosa; mucosa of sigmoid colon; rectum; epithelium of nasopharynx; right uterine tube / Top expressed in: left colon; Paneth cell; cumulus cell; ascending aorta; aortic valve; crypt of lieberkuhn of small intestine; motor neuron; lobe of prostate; seminal vesicula; lacrimal gland; More reference expression data
BioGPS	More reference expression data
Gene ontology
Molecular function	protein binding; UDP-galactose transmembrane transporter activity; pyrimidine nucleotide-sugar transmembrane transporter activity
Cellular component	integral component of membrane; Golgi membrane; Golgi apparatus; endoplasmic reticulum; nucleus; membrane; integral component of Golgi membrane
Biological process	galactose metabolic process; carbohydrate transport; UDP-galactose transmembrane transport; pyrimidine nucleotide-sugar transmembrane transport
Sources:Amigo / QuickGO
Orthologs
Databases	NCBI: entry; OMA: entry
Species	Human	Mouse
Entrez	7355	22232
Ensembl	ENSG00000102100	ENSMUSG00000031156
UniProt	P78381	Q9R0M8
RefSeq (mRNA)	NM_005660; NM_001032289; NM_001042498; NM_001282647; NM_001282648 NM_001282649; NM_001282650; NM_001282651	NM_001083937; NM_078484
RefSeq (protein)	NP_001027460; NP_001035963; NP_001269576; NP_001269577; NP_001269578 NP_001269579; NP_001269580; NP_005651	NP_001077406; NP_511039
Location (UCSC)	Chr X: 48.9 – 48.91 Mb	Chr X: 7.75 – 7.76 Mb
PubMed search
- Wikidata
View/Edit Human	View/Edit Mouse

UDP-galactose translocator is a protein that in humans is encoded by the SLC35A2 gene.

Somatic loss-of-function variants in the SLC35A2 gene were originally associated with focal epilepsy with radiographically nonlesional epilepsy. Later it was discovered that individuals with somatic variants in SLC35A2 have a mild malformation of cortical development with oligodendroglial hyperplasia in epilepsy (MOGHE), which is a subtype of frontal lobe epilepsy.

== See also ==
- Solute carrier family
