= SFXN5 =

Protein-coding gene in the species Homo sapiens

Identifiers
- Aliases: SFXN5, BBG-TCC, sideroflexin 5, SLC56A5
- External IDs: OMIM: 615572; MGI: 2137681; GeneCards: SFXN5

Gene location (Human)
Chr.	Chromosome 2 (human)
Band	2p13.2	Start	72,942,036 bp
Band	2p13.2	End	73,075,619 bp

Gene location (Mouse)
Chr.	Chromosome 6 (mouse)
Band	6 C3|6 37.23 cM	Start	85,190,031 bp
Band	6 C3|6 37.23 cM	End	85,310,404 bp
RNA expression pattern
Bgee	Human / Mouse (ortholog); Top expressed in: amygdala; putamen; right frontal lobe; caudate nucleus; nucleus accumbens; cingulate gyrus; anterior cingulate cortex; Brodmann area 9; ventricular zone; prefrontal cortex / Top expressed in: granulocyte; dentate gyrus of hippocampal formation granule cell; Region I of hippocampus proper; substantia nigra; superior frontal gyrus; supraoptic nucleus; otolith organ; cerebellar cortex; primary visual cortex; utricle; More reference expression data
BioGPS	n/a
Gene ontology
Molecular function	citrate transmembrane transporter activity; ion transmembrane transporter activity
Cellular component	integral component of membrane; membrane; mitochondrion; mitochondrial membranes
Biological process	citrate transport; ion transmembrane transport; iron ion homeostasis; ion transport; transmembrane transport; amino acid transport
Sources:Amigo / QuickGO
Orthologs
Databases	NCBI: entry; OMA: entry
Species	Human	Mouse
Entrez	94097	94282
Ensembl	ENSG00000144040	ENSMUSG00000033720
UniProt	Q8TD22	Q925N0
RefSeq (mRNA)	NM_144579; NM_001330400; NM_001330401; NM_001330402; NM_001330403 NM_001330404; NM_001330405; NM_001330406; NM_001330407; NM_001330408; NM_001330410; NM_001330411; NM_001330412; NM_001371737; NM_001371738; NM_001371739; NM_001371740; NM_001371741; NM_001371742; NM_001371743	NM_178639
RefSeq (protein)	NP_001317329; NP_001317330; NP_001317331; NP_001317332; NP_001317333 NP_001317334; NP_001317335; NP_001317336; NP_001317337; NP_001317339; NP_001317340; NP_001317341; NP_653180; NP_001358666; NP_001358667; NP_001358668; NP_001358669; NP_001358670; NP_001358671; NP_001358672	NP_848754
Location (UCSC)	Chr 2: 72.94 – 73.08 Mb	Chr 6: 85.19 – 85.31 Mb
PubMed search
- Wikidata
View/Edit Human	View/Edit Mouse

Sideroflexin-5 is a protein that in humans is encoded by the SFXN5 gene. Sideroflexin-5 is a membrane transporter that belongs to solute carrier family 56. It is associated with citrate transmembrane transport and mitochondrial transmembrane transport.
