= Cationic amino acid transporter 3 =

Protein found in humans

SLC7A3

Identifiers
- Aliases: SLC7A3, ATRC3, CAT-3, CAT3, solute carrier family 7 member 3
- External IDs: OMIM: 300443; MGI: 1100521; GeneCards: SLC7A3

Gene location (Human)
Chr.	X chromosome (human)
Band	Xq13.1	Start	70,925,579 bp
Band	Xq13.1	End	70,931,125 bp

Gene location (Mouse)
Chr.	X chromosome (mouse)
Band	X|X C3- D	Start	100,122,816 bp
Band	X|X C3- D	End	100,129,626 bp
RNA expression pattern
Bgee	Human / Mouse (ortholog); Top expressed in: tail of epididymis; gonad; tibialis anterior muscle; ventricular zone; thymus; ganglionic eminence; testicle; gastric mucosa; mucosa of ileum; body of uterus / Top expressed in: epiblast; embryo; dorsomedial hypothalamic nucleus; otic placode; ventral tegmental area; paraventricular nucleus of hypothalamus; central gray substance of midbrain; lateral hypothalamus; primitive streak; ventromedial nucleus; More reference expression data
BioGPS	n/a
Gene ontology
Molecular function	basic amino acid transmembrane transporter activity; L-lysine transmembrane transporter activity; amino acid transmembrane transporter activity; transmembrane transporter activity; L-ornithine transmembrane transporter activity
Cellular component	integral component of membrane; membrane; plasma membrane
Biological process	basic amino acid transmembrane transport; L-lysine transmembrane transport; L-alpha-amino acid transmembrane transport; L-arginine transmembrane transport; amino acid transport; transmembrane transport; L-arginine import across plasma membrane; L-ornithine transmembrane transport
Sources:Amigo / QuickGO
Orthologs
Databases	NCBI: entry; OMA: entry
Species	Human	Mouse
Entrez	84889	11989
Ensembl	ENSG00000165349	ENSMUSG00000031297
UniProt	Q8WY07	P70423
RefSeq (mRNA)	NM_032803; NM_001048164	NM_001301840; NM_007515
RefSeq (protein)	NP_001041629; NP_116192	NP_001288769; NP_031541
Location (UCSC)	Chr X: 70.93 – 70.93 Mb	Chr X: 100.12 – 100.13 Mb
PubMed search
- Wikidata
View/Edit Human	View/Edit Mouse

Cationic amino acid transporter 3 is a protein that in humans is encoded by the SLC7A3 gene.

SLC7A3 is a member of the system y+ family of transporters characterized by sodium-independent transport of cationic amino acids.[supplied by OMIM]

== See also ==
- Solute carrier family
