= Sodium-coupled neutral amino acid transporter 2 =

Protein-coding gene in the species Homo sapiens

SLC38A2

Identifiers
- Aliases: SLC38A2, ATA2, PRO1068, SAT2, SNAT2, solute carrier family 38 member 2
- External IDs: OMIM: 605180; MGI: 1915010; GeneCards: SLC38A2

Gene location (Human)
Chr.	Chromosome 12 (human)
Band	12q13.11	Start	46,358,188 bp
Band	12q13.11	End	46,372,773 bp

Gene location (Mouse)
Chr.	Chromosome 15 (mouse)
Band	15|15 F1	Start	96,585,273 bp
Band	15|15 F1	End	96,597,611 bp
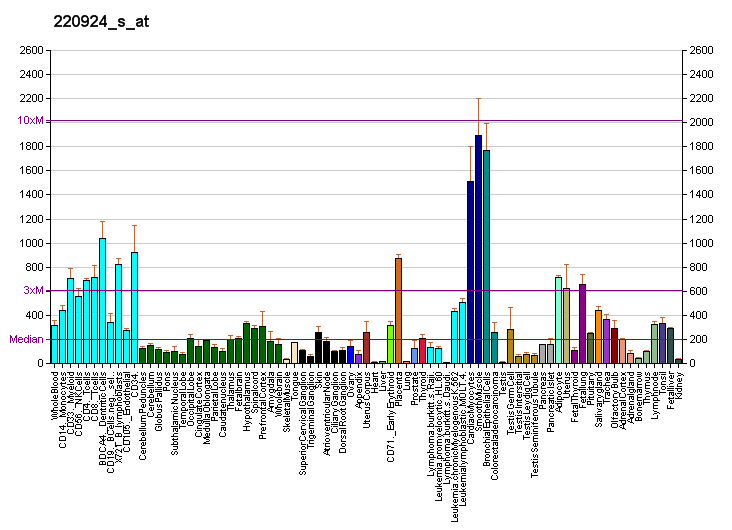

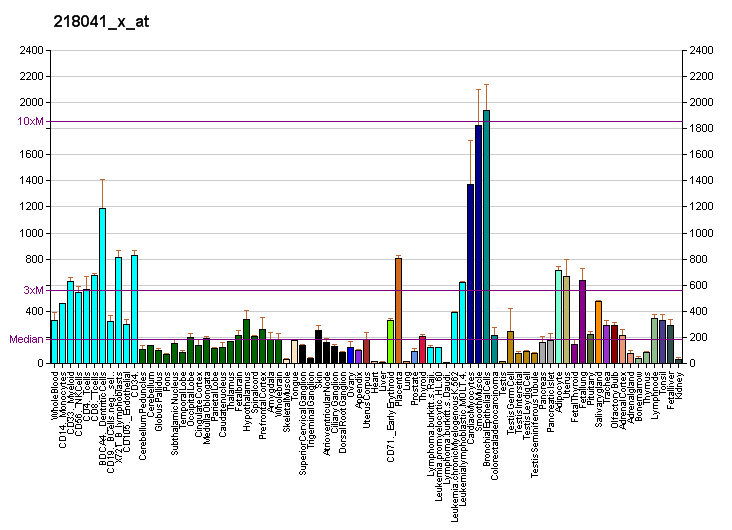
RNA expression pattern
Bgee	Human / Mouse (ortholog); Top expressed in: tibia; visceral pleura; parietal pleura; gingival epithelium; skin of thigh; skin of hip; endothelial cell; lower lobe of lung; germinal epithelium; mucosa of paranasal sinus / Top expressed in: epithelium of lens; endothelial cell of lymphatic vessel; medullary collecting duct; pineal gland; renal corpuscle; Paneth cell; hand; lacrimal gland; atrium; parotid gland; More reference expression data
BioGPS	More reference expression data
Gene ontology
Molecular function	protein binding; symporter activity; amino acid transmembrane transporter activity; L-glutamine transmembrane transporter activity
Cellular component	integral component of membrane; membrane; plasma membrane; integral component of plasma membrane; axon; soma; dendrite; brush border; sarcolemma
Biological process	sodium ion transport; female pregnancy; cellular response to amino acid starvation; glutamate secretion; cellular response to mechanical stimulus; glycine betaine transport; cerebral cortex development; amino acid transport; alanine transport; ion transport; amino acid transmembrane transport; glutamine transport
Sources:Amigo / QuickGO
Orthologs
Databases	NCBI: entry; OMA: entry
Species	Human	Mouse
Entrez	54407	67760
Ensembl	ENSG00000134294	ENSMUSG00000022462
UniProt	Q96QD8	Q8CFE6
RefSeq (mRNA)	NM_001307936; NM_018976	NM_175121; NM_001355633
RefSeq (protein)	NP_001294865; NP_061849; NP_061849.2	NP_780330; NP_001342562
Location (UCSC)	Chr 12: 46.36 – 46.37 Mb	Chr 15: 96.59 – 96.6 Mb
PubMed search
- Wikidata
View/Edit Human	View/Edit Mouse

Sodium-coupled neutral amino acid transporter 2 is a protein that in humans is encoded by the SLC38A2 gene.

== See also ==
- Solute carrier family
