= Sodium-coupled neutral amino acid transporter 3 =

Protein-coding gene in the species Homo sapiens

SLC38A3

Identifiers
- Aliases: SLC38A3, G17, NAT1, SN1, SNAT3, solute carrier family 38 member 3
- External IDs: OMIM: 604437; MGI: 1923507; GeneCards: SLC38A3

Gene location (Human)
Chr.	Chromosome 3 (human)
Band	3p21.31	Start	50,205,246 bp
Band	3p21.31	End	50,221,486 bp

Gene location (Mouse)
Chr.	Chromosome 9 (mouse)
Band	9 F1|9 58.69 cM	Start	107,527,833 bp
Band	9 F1|9 58.69 cM	End	107,546,729 bp
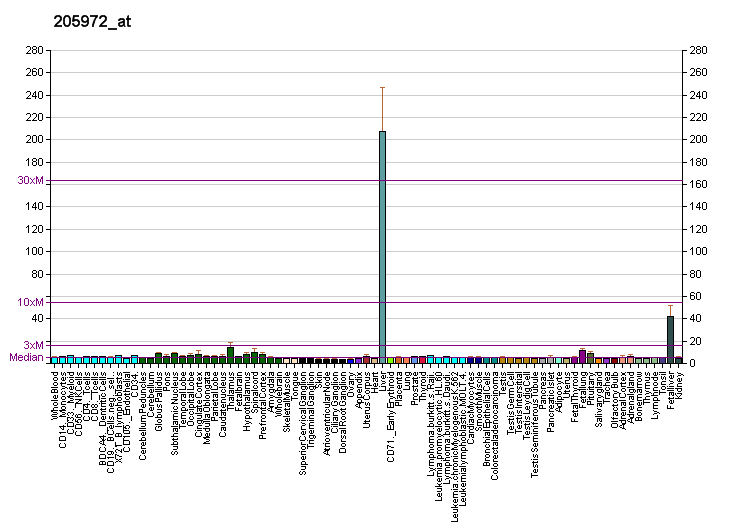
RNA expression pattern
Bgee	Human / Mouse (ortholog); Top expressed in: right lobe of liver; muscle of thigh; body of pancreas; C1 segment; ganglionic eminence; right frontal lobe; ventricular zone; gastrocnemius muscle; caudate nucleus; amygdala / Top expressed in: neural layer of retina; left lobe of liver; Epithelium of choroid plexus; muscle of thigh; soleus muscle; lumbar subsegment of spinal cord; right ventricle; superior frontal gyrus; primary visual cortex; ankle; More reference expression data
BioGPS	More reference expression data
Gene ontology
Molecular function	L-glutamine transmembrane transporter activity; L-histidine transmembrane transporter activity; L-asparagine transmembrane transporter activity; L-alanine transmembrane transporter activity; antiporter activity; symporter activity; amino acid transmembrane transporter activity
Cellular component	integral component of membrane; membrane; plasma membrane; integral component of plasma membrane; basolateral plasma membrane
Biological process	L-alanine transport; sodium ion transport; histidine transport; female pregnancy; positive regulation of transcription from RNA polymerase II promoter in response to acidic pH; positive regulation of glutamine transport; brain development; asparagine transport; amino acid transport; cellular response to potassium ion starvation; glutamine transport; ion transport; amino acid transmembrane transport; transmembrane transport; L-histidine transmembrane transport
Sources:Amigo / QuickGO
Orthologs
Databases	NCBI: entry; OMA: entry
Species	Human	Mouse
Entrez	10991	76257
Ensembl	ENSG00000188338	ENSMUSG00000010064
UniProt	Q99624	Q9DCP2
RefSeq (mRNA)	NM_006841	NM_001199217; NM_001199218; NM_023805
RefSeq (protein)	NP_006832	NP_001186146; NP_001186147; NP_076294
Location (UCSC)	Chr 3: 50.21 – 50.22 Mb	Chr 9: 107.53 – 107.55 Mb
PubMed search
- Wikidata
View/Edit Human	View/Edit Mouse

Sodium-coupled neutral amino acid transporter 3 is a protein that in humans is encoded by the SLC38A3 gene.

== See also ==
- Solute carrier family
