= SLC45A1 =

Protein found in humans

Identifiers
- Aliases: SLC45A1, DNB5, solute carrier family 45 member 1, IDDNPF, PAST-A
- External IDs: OMIM: 605763; MGI: 2653235; GeneCards: SLC45A1

Gene location (Human)
Chr.	Chromosome 1 (human)
Band	1p36.23	Start	8,317,826 bp
Band	1p36.23	End	8,344,167 bp

Gene location (Mouse)
Chr.	Chromosome 4 (mouse)
Band	4|4 E2	Start	150,713,029 bp
Band	4|4 E2	End	150,736,631 bp
RNA expression pattern
Bgee	Human / Mouse (ortholog); Top expressed in: testicle; gonad; prefrontal cortex; right frontal lobe; right hemisphere of cerebellum; Brodmann area 9; middle temporal gyrus; Brodmann area 23; primary visual cortex; cingulate gyrus / Top expressed in: primary visual cortex; superior frontal gyrus; cerebellar cortex; dentate gyrus of hippocampal formation granule cell; neural tube; hippocampus proper; gastrula; brain stem; mesencephalon; hypothalamus; More reference expression data
BioGPS	n/a
Gene ontology
Molecular function	symporter activity; sucrose:proton symporter activity
Cellular component	integral component of membrane; membrane
Biological process	transmembrane transport; carbohydrate transport; glucose transmembrane transport; sucrose transport
Sources:Amigo / QuickGO
Orthologs
Databases	NCBI: entry; OMA: entry
Species	Human	Mouse
Entrez	50651	242773
Ensembl	ENSG00000162426	ENSMUSG00000039838
UniProt	Q9Y2W3	Q8BIV7
RefSeq (mRNA)	NM_001080397	NM_173774; NM_001355737
RefSeq (protein)	NP_001073866; NP_001366543; NP_001366544; NP_001366545; NP_001366546 NP_001366547	NP_776135; NP_001342666
Location (UCSC)	Chr 1: 8.32 – 8.34 Mb	Chr 4: 150.71 – 150.74 Mb
PubMed search
- Wikidata
View/Edit Human	View/Edit Mouse

SLC45A1 is a member of the SLC45 family of solute carriers. Analysis of the protein function in a recombinant yeast expression assay show that it can: (i) transport a disaccharide, such as glucose and sucrose (ii) perform secondary active transport in a proton-dependent manner.

It is associated with sugar transport in the brain, and rare mutations in the gene are associated with intellectual disability and epilepsy. analogous to the effect of mutation of the cerebral glucose transporter GLUT1(SLC2A1).
