= Choline transporter-like protein 2 =

Protein-coding gene in the species Homo sapiens

SLC44A2

Identifiers
- Aliases: SLC44A2, CTL2, PP1292, solute carrier family 44 member 2
- External IDs: OMIM: 606106; MGI: 1915932; GeneCards: SLC44A2

Gene location (Human)
Chr.	Chromosome 19 (human)
Band	19p13.2	Start	10,602,457 bp
Band	19p13.2	End	10,644,557 bp

Gene location (Mouse)
Chr.	Chromosome 9 (mouse)
Band	9|9 A3	Start	21,231,994 bp
Band	9|9 A3	End	21,266,324 bp
RNA expression pattern
Bgee	Human / Mouse (ortholog); Top expressed in: tibial nerve; right lung; right testis; left testis; spleen; right coronary artery; popliteal artery; granulocyte; tibial arteries; upper lobe of left lung / Top expressed in: vestibular membrane of cochlear duct; gastrula; decidua; aortic valve; ascending aorta; left lung lobe; right lung lobe; stria vascularis; transitional epithelium of urinary bladder; hair follicle; More reference expression data
BioGPS	n/a
Gene ontology
Molecular function	choline transmembrane transporter activity; signal transducer activity
Cellular component	integral component of membrane; lysosomal membrane; plasma membrane; extracellular exosome; membrane; specific granule membrane
Biological process	positive regulation of I-kappaB kinase/NF-kappaB signaling; phosphatidylcholine biosynthetic process; choline transport; transmembrane transport; signal transduction; neutrophil degranulation; transport
Sources:Amigo / QuickGO
Orthologs
Databases	NCBI: entry; OMA: entry
Species	Human	Mouse
Entrez	57153	68682
Ensembl	ENSG00000129353	ENSMUSG00000057193
UniProt	Q8IWA5	Q8BY89
RefSeq (mRNA)	NM_001145056; NM_020428; NM_001363611	NM_001199186; NM_152808; NM_001359227
RefSeq (protein)	NP_001138528; NP_065161; NP_001350540	NP_001186115; NP_690021; NP_001346156
Location (UCSC)	Chr 19: 10.6 – 10.64 Mb	Chr 9: 21.23 – 21.27 Mb
PubMed search
- Wikidata
View/Edit Human	View/Edit Mouse

Choline transporter-like protein 2 is a protein that in humans is encoded by the SLC44A2 gene.

== See also ==
- Solute carrier family
