= Zinc transporter ZIP11 =

Protein-coding gene in the species Homo sapiens

SLC39A11

Identifiers
- Aliases: SLC39A11, C17orf26, ZIP11, solute carrier family 39 member 11, ZIP-11
- External IDs: OMIM: 616508; MGI: 1917056; GeneCards: SLC39A11

Gene location (Human)
Chr.	Chromosome 17 (human)
Band	17q24.3-q25.1	Start	72,645,949 bp
Band	17q24.3-q25.1	End	73,092,712 bp

Gene location (Mouse)
Chr.	Chromosome 11 (mouse)
Band	11|11 E2	Start	113,135,679 bp
Band	11|11 E2	End	113,540,905 bp
RNA expression pattern
Bgee	Human / Mouse (ortholog); Top expressed in: bone marrow cell; mucosa of ileum; pancreatic ductal cell; epithelium of colon; monocyte; nasal epithelium; rectum; skin of arm; liver; right lobe of liver / Top expressed in: epithelium of stomach; pyloric antrum; parotid gland; mucous cell of stomach; submandibular gland; lacrimal gland; crypt of lieberkuhn of small intestine; duodenum; left colon; molar; More reference expression data
BioGPS	n/a
Gene ontology
Molecular function	metal ion transmembrane transporter activity; zinc ion transmembrane transporter activity
Cellular component	cytoplasm; integral component of membrane; plasma membrane; Golgi apparatus; nucleus; membrane; fungal-type vacuole membrane
Biological process	metal ion transport; zinc ion transport; ion transport; transmembrane transport; zinc ion transmembrane transport
Sources:Amigo / QuickGO
Orthologs
Databases	NCBI: entry; OMA: entry
Species	Human	Mouse
Entrez	201266	69806
Ensembl	ENSG00000133195; ENSG00000282291	ENSMUSG00000041654
UniProt	Q8N1S5	Q8BWY7
RefSeq (mRNA)	NM_001159770; NM_139177; NM_001352691; NM_001352692; NM_001352693	NM_001166503; NM_027216; NM_001362937; NM_001362938; NM_001362939 NM_001362940; NM_001362941; NM_001362942; NM_001362943; NM_001362944
RefSeq (protein)	NP_001153242; NP_631916; NP_001339620; NP_001339621; NP_001339622	NP_001159975; NP_081492; NP_001349866; NP_001349867; NP_001349868 NP_001349869; NP_001349870; NP_001349871; NP_001349872; NP_001349873
Location (UCSC)	Chr 17: 72.65 – 73.09 Mb	Chr 11: 113.14 – 113.54 Mb
PubMed search
- Wikidata
View/Edit Human	View/Edit Mouse

Zinc transporter ZIP11, also known as solute carrier family 39 member 11 is a protein that in humans is encoded by the SLC39A11 gene.

== See also ==
- Solute carrier family
