= Zinc transporter ZIP14 =

Protein-coding gene in the species Homo sapiens

SLC39A14

Identifiers
- Aliases: SLC39A14, LZT-Hs4, NET34, ZIP14, cig19, solute carrier family 39 member 14, HMNDYT2, HCIN
- External IDs: OMIM: 608736; MGI: 2384851; GeneCards: SLC39A14

Gene location (Human)
Chr.	Chromosome 8 (human)
Band	8p21.3	Start	22,367,278 bp
Band	8p21.3	End	22,434,129 bp

Gene location (Mouse)
Chr.	Chromosome 14 (mouse)
Band	14|14 D2	Start	70,540,918 bp
Band	14|14 D2	End	70,588,874 bp
RNA expression pattern
Bgee	Human / Mouse (ortholog); Top expressed in: cartilage tissue; body of pancreas; liver; right lobe of liver; tibia; jejunal mucosa; duodenum; pericardium; oocyte; islet of Langerhans / Top expressed in: gastrula; molar; ascending aorta; calvaria; aortic valve; duodenum; facial skeleton; membranous bone; hepatobiliary system; liver; More reference expression data
BioGPS	n/a
Gene ontology
Molecular function	ferrous iron transmembrane transporter activity; metal ion transmembrane transporter activity; zinc ion transmembrane transporter activity; manganese ion transmembrane transporter activity
Cellular component	cell projection; membrane; integral component of plasma membrane; lamellipodium; integral component of membrane; plasma membrane; cytoplasm
Biological process	metal ion transport; zinc ion transport; ion transport; zinc ion transmembrane transport; iron ion transport; cellular zinc ion homeostasis; zinc ion import across plasma membrane; transmembrane transport; manganese ion transmembrane transport; iron ion transmembrane transport
Sources:Amigo / QuickGO
Orthologs
Databases	NCBI: entry; OMA: entry
Species	Human	Mouse
Entrez	23516	213053
Ensembl	ENSG00000104635	ENSMUSG00000022094
UniProt	Q15043	Q75N73
RefSeq (mRNA)	NM_001128431; NM_001135153; NM_001135154; NM_015359; NM_001351655 NM_001351656; NM_001351657; NM_001351658; NM_001351659; NM_001351660	NM_001135151; NM_001135152; NM_144808
RefSeq (protein)	NP_001121903; NP_001128625; NP_001128626; NP_056174; NP_001338584 NP_001338585; NP_001338586; NP_001338587; NP_001338588; NP_001338589	NP_001128623; NP_001128624; NP_659057
Location (UCSC)	Chr 8: 22.37 – 22.43 Mb	Chr 14: 70.54 – 70.59 Mb
PubMed search
- Wikidata
View/Edit Human	View/Edit Mouse

Zinc transporter ZIP14, also known as solute carrier family 39 member 14, is a protein that in humans is encoded by the SLC39A14 gene.

== See also ==
- Solute carrier family
