= SFXN2 =

Protein-coding gene in the species Homo sapiens

Identifiers
- Aliases: SFXN2, sideroflexin 2, SLC56A2
- External IDs: OMIM: 615570; MGI: 2137678; GeneCards: SFXN2

Gene location (Human)
Chr.	Chromosome 10 (human)
Band	10q24.32	Start	102,714,538 bp
Band	10q24.32	End	102,743,492 bp

Gene location (Mouse)
Chr.	Chromosome 19 (mouse)
Band	19|19 C3	Start	46,561,804 bp
Band	19|19 C3	End	46,586,505 bp
RNA expression pattern
Bgee	Human / Mouse (ortholog); Top expressed in: pancreatic ductal cell; human kidney; mucosa of ileum; right lobe of liver; parotid gland; renal cortex; right ovary; left ovary; body of pancreas; right lobe of thyroid gland / Top expressed in: Rostral migratory stream; left lobe of liver; islet of Langerhans; right kidney; otic vesicle; parotid gland; lumbar subsegment of spinal cord; trigeminal ganglion; fossa; yolk sac; More reference expression data
BioGPS	n/a
Gene ontology
Molecular function	ion transmembrane transporter activity
Cellular component	integral component of membrane; membrane; mitochondrion; mitochondrial membranes
Biological process	ion transmembrane transport; iron ion homeostasis; ion transport; transmembrane transport; mitochondrial transmembrane transport; amino acid transport
Sources:Amigo / QuickGO
Orthologs
Databases	NCBI: entry; OMA: entry
Species	Human	Mouse
Entrez	118980	94279
Ensembl	ENSG00000156398	ENSMUSG00000025036
UniProt	Q96NB2	Q925N2
RefSeq (mRNA)	NM_178858; NM_001350989	NM_053196
RefSeq (protein)	NP_849189; NP_001337918	NP_444426
Location (UCSC)	Chr 10: 102.71 – 102.74 Mb	Chr 19: 46.56 – 46.59 Mb
PubMed search
- Wikidata
View/Edit Human	View/Edit Mouse

Sideroflexin-2 is a protein that in humans is encoded by the SFXN2 gene. Sideroflexin-2 is a membrane transporter that belongs to solute carrier family 56. It is associated with serine import into mitochondrion and broader monoatomic ion transmembrane transport.
