= Sodium-dependent phosphate transport protein 1 =

Protein-coding gene in the species Homo sapiens

SLC17A1

Identifiers
- Aliases: SLC17A1, NAPI-1, NPT-1, NPT1, solute carrier family 17 member 1
- External IDs: OMIM: 182308; MGI: 103209; GeneCards: SLC17A1

Gene location (Human)
| Chr. | Chromosome 6 (human) |
| Band | 6p22.2 | Start | 25,782,915 bp |
| Band | 6p22.2 | End | 25,832,052 bp |

Gene location (Mouse)
| Chr. | Chromosome 13 (mouse) |
| Band | 13 A3.1|13 9.97 cM | Start | 24,051,733 bp |
| Band | 13 A3.1|13 9.97 cM | End | 24,079,713 bp |
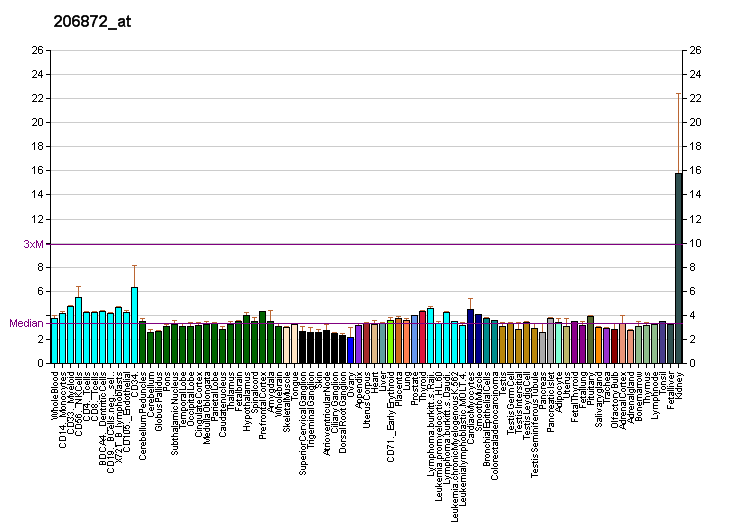
RNA expression pattern
| Bgee | Human / Mouse (ortholog); Top expressed in: right lobe of liver; kidney tubule; renal cortex; metanephric glomerulus; renal medulla; islet of Langerhans; human kidney; left testis; right testis; mucosa of transverse colon / Top expressed in: right kidney; human kidney; proximal tubule; left lobe of liver; neural layer of retina; epithelium of lens; retinal pigment epithelium; primary visual cortex; stroma of bone marrow; duodenum; More reference expression data |
| BioGPS | More reference expression data |
Gene ontology
| Molecular function | sodium:phosphate symporter activity; phosphate ion transmembrane transporter activity; symporter activity; sialic acid transmembrane transporter activity |
| Cellular component | integral component of membrane; integral component of plasma membrane; membrane; plasma membrane; apical plasma membrane; lysosome |
| Biological process | phosphate ion transport; phosphate ion transmembrane transport; ion transport; sodium ion transmembrane transport; urate metabolic process; sodium ion transport; transmembrane transport; sodium-dependent phosphate transport; urate transport; sialic acid transport |
Sources:Amigo / QuickGO
Orthologs
| Databases | NCBI: entry; OMA: entry |
| Species | Human | Mouse |
| Entrez | 6568 | 20504 |
| Ensembl | ENSG00000124568 | ENSMUSG00000021335 |
| UniProt | Q14916 | Q61983 |
| RefSeq (mRNA) | NM_005074 | NM_001170638; NM_009198 |
| RefSeq (protein) | NP_005065 | NP_001164109; NP_033224 |
| Location (UCSC) | Chr 6: 25.78 – 25.83 Mb | Chr 13: 24.05 – 24.08 Mb |
| PubMed search |
- Wikidata
| View/Edit Human | View/Edit Mouse |

Sodium-dependent phosphate transport protein 1 is a protein that in humans is encoded by the SLC17A1 gene.

== See also ==
- Solute carrier family
