= Glucose-6-phosphate exchanger SLC37A2 =

Biological protein

SLC37A2

Identifiers
- Aliases: SLC37A2, pp11662, solute carrier family 37 member 2, SPX2
- External IDs: MGI: 1929693; GeneCards: SLC37A2

Gene location (Human)
Chr.	Chromosome 11 (human)
Band	11q24.2	Start	125,063,302 bp
Band	11q24.2	End	125,090,516 bp

Gene location (Mouse)
Chr.	Chromosome 9 (mouse)
Band	9|9 A4	Start	37,138,881 bp
Band	9|9 A4	End	37,167,034 bp
RNA expression pattern
Bgee	Human / Mouse (ortholog); Top expressed in: right adrenal gland; left adrenal gland; right adrenal cortex; left adrenal cortex; skin of limb; skin of leg; monocyte; skin of arm; granulocyte; parotid gland / Top expressed in: parotid gland; left colon; duodenum; epithelium of small intestine; body of femur; stroma of bone marrow; submandibular gland; esophagus; granulocyte; Epithelium of choroid plexus; More reference expression data
BioGPS	n/a
Gene ontology
Molecular function	transporter activity; antiporter activity; glucose 6-phosphate:inorganic phosphate antiporter activity; transmembrane transporter activity
Cellular component	integral component of endoplasmic reticulum membrane; extracellular exosome; membrane; endoplasmic reticulum; integral component of membrane; endoplasmic reticulum membrane
Biological process	phosphate ion transmembrane transport; carbohydrate transport; transmembrane transport; glucose-6-phosphate transport; transport
Sources:Amigo / QuickGO
Orthologs
Databases	NCBI: entry; OMA: entry
Species	Human	Mouse
Entrez	219855	56857
Ensembl	ENSG00000134955	ENSMUSG00000032122
UniProt	Q8TED4	Q9WU81
RefSeq (mRNA)	NM_001145290; NM_198277	NM_001145960; NM_020258
RefSeq (protein)	NP_001138762; NP_938018	NP_001139432; NP_064654
Location (UCSC)	Chr 11: 125.06 – 125.09 Mb	Chr 9: 37.14 – 37.17 Mb
PubMed search
- Wikidata
View/Edit Human	View/Edit Mouse

Glucose-6-phosphate exchanger SLC37A2 is a protein that in humans is encoded by the SLC37A2 gene.
