= Major facilitator superfamily domain containing 2B =

Protein-coding gene in the species Homo sapiens

MFSD2B

Identifiers
- Aliases: MFSD2B, major facilitator superfamily domain containing 2B, SLC59A2
- External IDs: OMIM: 617845; MGI: 3583946; GeneCards: MFSD2B

Gene location (Human)
| Chr. | Chromosome 2 (human) |
| Band | 2p23.3 | Start | 24,010,081 bp |
| Band | 2p23.3 | End | 24,063,321 bp |

Gene location (Mouse)
| Chr. | Chromosome 12 (mouse) |
| Band | 12|12 A1.1 | Start | 4,912,440 bp |
| Band | 12|12 A1.1 | End | 4,924,359 bp |
RNA expression pattern
| Bgee | Human / Mouse (ortholog); Top expressed in: blood; monocyte; bone marrow; testicle; bone marrow cell; thymus; gonad; stromal cell of endometrium; placenta; granulocyte / Top expressed in: blood; spleen; yolk sac; bone marrow; neural layer of retina; embryo; human fetus; granulocyte; body of femur; blastocyst; More reference expression data |
| BioGPS | n/a |
Gene ontology
| Molecular function | sphingolipid transporter activity; symporter activity; transporter activity |
| Cellular component | membrane; integral component of membrane; plasma membrane; integral component of plasma membrane |
| Biological process | lipid transport; carbohydrate transport; transmembrane transport; organic substance transport |
Sources:Amigo / QuickGO
Orthologs
| Databases | NCBI: entry; OMA: entry |
| Species | Human | Mouse |
| Entrez | 388931 | 432628 |
| Ensembl | ENSG00000205639 | ENSMUSG00000037336 |
| UniProt | A6NFX1 | Q3T9M1 |
| RefSeq (mRNA) | NM_001080473; NM_001346880 | NM_001033488 |
| RefSeq (protein) | NP_001333809 | NP_001028660 |
| Location (UCSC) | Chr 2: 24.01 – 24.06 Mb | Chr 12: 4.91 – 4.92 Mb |
| PubMed search |
- Wikidata
| View/Edit Human | View/Edit Mouse |

Major facilitator superfamily domain containing 2B is a protein that in humans is encoded by the MFSD2B gene.
