= Sodium/bile acid cotransporter 7 =

Protein-coding gene in the species Homo sapiens

SLC10A7

Identifiers
- Aliases: SLC10A7, C4orf13, P7, solute carrier family 10 member 7, SSASKS
- External IDs: OMIM: 611459; MGI: 1924025; GeneCards: SLC10A7

Gene location (Human)
Chr.	Chromosome 4 (human)
Band	4q31.22	Start	146,253,975 bp
Band	4q31.22	End	146,522,372 bp

Gene location (Mouse)
Chr.	Chromosome 8 (mouse)
Band	8|8 C1	Start	79,235,975 bp
Band	8|8 C1	End	79,460,632 bp
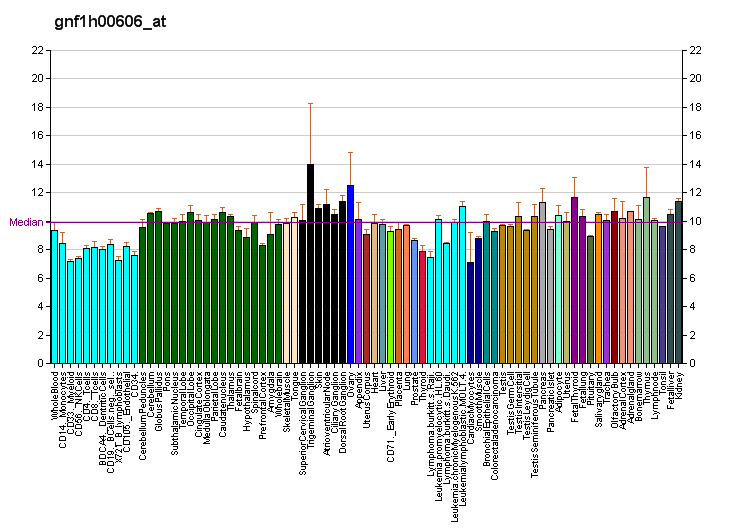
RNA expression pattern
Bgee	Human / Mouse (ortholog); Top expressed in: pancreatic epithelial cell; secondary oocyte; bone marrow cell; Achilles tendon; gonad; epithelium of colon; germinal epithelium; pancreatic ductal cell; tibia; rectum / Top expressed in: otolith organ; utricle; lumbar spinal ganglion; Paneth cell; hand; trigeminal ganglion; superior cervical ganglion; urothelium; endothelial cell of lymphatic vessel; genital tubercle; More reference expression data
BioGPS	More reference expression data
Gene ontology
Molecular function	symporter activity
Cellular component	membrane; integral component of membrane; endoplasmic reticulum; endoplasmic reticulum membrane; plasma membrane
Biological process	ion transport; transmembrane transport; sodium ion transport
Sources:Amigo / QuickGO
Orthologs
Databases	NCBI: entry; OMA: entry
Species	Human	Mouse
Entrez	84068	76775
Ensembl	ENSG00000120519	ENSMUSG00000031684
UniProt	Q0GE19	Q5PT53
RefSeq (mRNA)	NM_001029998; NM_001030316; NM_001300842; NM_032128; NM_001317816 NM_001317817; NM_001317818	NM_001009980; NM_001009981; NM_001282108; NM_001282109; NM_029736
RefSeq (protein)	NP_001025169; NP_001287771; NP_001304745; NP_001304746; NP_001304747 NP_115504	NP_001009981; NP_001269037; NP_001269038; NP_084012
Location (UCSC)	Chr 4: 146.25 – 146.52 Mb	Chr 8: 79.24 – 79.46 Mb
PubMed search
- Wikidata
View/Edit Human	View/Edit Mouse

Sodium/bile acid cotransporter 7 is a protein which in humans is encoded by the SLC10A7 gene.

== See also ==
- SLC10A7+protein,+human at the U.S. National Library of Medicine Medical Subject Headings (MeSH)
