= SLC22A25 =

Protein-coding gene in the species Homo sapiens

Identifiers
- Aliases: SLC22A25, HIMTP, UST6, solute carrier family 22 member 25
- External IDs: OMIM: 610792; MGI: 2442750; GeneCards: SLC22A25

Gene location (Human)
Chr.	Chromosome 11 (human)
Band	11q12.3	Start	63,158,437 bp
Band	11q12.3	End	63,243,599 bp

Gene location (Mouse)
Chr.	Chromosome 19 (mouse)
Band	19|19 A	Start	8,312,735 bp
Band	19|19 A	End	8,382,475 bp
RNA expression pattern
Bgee	Human / Mouse (ortholog); Top expressed in: right lobe of liver; buccal mucosa cell; gonad; gallbladder; nucleus accumbens; vagina; white blood cell; myeloid leukocyte; monocyte; right frontal lobe / Top expressed in: proximal tubule; right kidney; human kidney; liver; gallbladder; metanephros; embryo; primary oocyte; neural layer of retina; secondary oocyte; More reference expression data
BioGPS	n/a
Gene ontology
Molecular function	sodium-independent organic anion transmembrane transporter activity; inorganic anion exchanger activity; urate transmembrane transporter activity
Cellular component	integral component of membrane; integral component of plasma membrane; membrane; plasma membrane
Biological process	sodium-independent organic anion transport; transmembrane transport; inorganic anion transport; urate transport; organic anion transport
Sources:Amigo / QuickGO
Orthologs
Databases	NCBI: entry; OMA: entry
Species	Human	Mouse
Entrez	387601	319800
Ensembl	ENSG00000196600	ENSMUSG00000052562
UniProt	Q6T423	n/a
RefSeq (mRNA)	NM_199352; NM_001394058; NM_001394059	NM_177002
RefSeq (protein)	NP_955384	n/a
Location (UCSC)	Chr 11: 63.16 – 63.24 Mb	Chr 19: 8.31 – 8.38 Mb
PubMed search
- Wikidata
View/Edit Human	View/Edit Mouse

Solute carrier family 22 member 25 (SLC22A25), also known as organic anion transporter UST6, is a protein that in humans is encoded by the SLC22A25 gene.
