= SLC38A10 =

Protein-coding gene in humans

Identifiers
- Aliases: SLC38A10, PP1744, solute carrier family 38 member 10
- External IDs: OMIM: 616525; MGI: 1919305; GeneCards: SLC38A10

Gene location (Human)
Chr.	Chromosome 17 (human)
Band	17q25.3	Start	81,244,811 bp
Band	17q25.3	End	81,295,547 bp

Gene location (Mouse)
Chr.	Chromosome 11 (mouse)
Band	11|11 E2	Start	119,994,786 bp
Band	11|11 E2	End	120,042,172 bp
RNA expression pattern
Bgee	Human / Mouse (ortholog); Top expressed in: anterior pituitary; body of pancreas; right lobe of liver; right lobe of thyroid gland; mucosa of transverse colon; apex of heart; right uterine tube; right coronary artery; left lobe of thyroid gland; granulocyte / Top expressed in: motor neuron; fossa; calvaria; aortic valve; ascending aorta; vestibular membrane of cochlear duct; Paneth cell; condyle; external carotid artery; iris; More reference expression data
BioGPS	n/a
Gene ontology
Molecular function	amino acid transmembrane transporter activity
Cellular component	integral component of membrane; membrane; Golgi apparatus
Biological process	amino acid transmembrane transport; bone development; ion transport; amino acid transport; sodium ion transport
Sources:Amigo / QuickGO
Orthologs
Databases	NCBI: entry; OMA: entry
Species	Human	Mouse
Entrez	124565	72055
Ensembl	ENSG00000157637	ENSMUSG00000061306
UniProt	Q9HBR0	Q5I012
RefSeq (mRNA)	NM_001037984; NM_138570	NM_001164798; NM_001164799; NM_001164800; NM_001164801; NM_001164802 NM_024249; NM_001361696; NM_001361697; NM_001361698; NM_001361699
RefSeq (protein)	NP_001033073; NP_612637	NP_001158270; NP_001158271; NP_001158272; NP_001158273; NP_001158274 NP_077211; NP_001348625; NP_001348626; NP_001348627; NP_001348628
Location (UCSC)	Chr 17: 81.24 – 81.3 Mb	Chr 11: 119.99 – 120.04 Mb
PubMed search
- Wikidata
View/Edit Human	View/Edit Mouse

Solute carrier family 38 member 10 is a protein that in humans is encoded by the SLC38A10 gene.

== Cellular localization ==
Cellular localization study of SLC38A10 protein was investigated on different cell lines and primary cortex neuronal cells using Immunocytochemistry and GFP SLC38A10 vector. SLC38A10 localized on Golgi apparatus and ER organelles.

Recent study on SLC38A10 knockout model provided some insight on possible association with p53 protein and cell survival.

== Cancer ==
A SLC38A family member has been observed progressively downregulated in Human papillomavirus-positive neoplastic keratinocytes derived from uterine cervical preneoplastic lesions at different levels of malignancy. For this reason, SLC38A is likely to be associated with tumorigenesis and may be a potential prognostic marker for uterine cervical preneoplastic lesions progression.
