= SLC35F1 =

Protein-coding gene in humans

Identifiers
- Aliases: SLC35F1, C6orf169, dJ230I3.1, solute carrier family 35 member F1
- External IDs: MGI: 2139810; GeneCards: SLC35F1

Gene location (Human)
| Chr. | Chromosome 6 (human) |
| Band | 6q22.2-q22.31 | Start | 117,907,264 bp |
| Band | 6q22.2-q22.31 | End | 118,317,676 bp |

Gene location (Mouse)
| Chr. | Chromosome 10 (mouse) |
| Band | 10|10 B3 | Start | 52,566,629 bp |
| Band | 10|10 B3 | End | 52,987,718 bp |
RNA expression pattern
| Bgee | Human / Mouse (ortholog); Top expressed in: ventricular zone; endothelial cell; Brodmann area 46; buccal mucosa cell; spinal ganglia; parietal lobe; middle temporal gyrus; postcentral gyrus; superior frontal gyrus; Brodmann area 23 / Top expressed in: olfactory tubercle; lateral septal nucleus; nucleus accumbens; ventricular zone; nucleus of stria terminalis; piriform cortex; ventral tegmental area; amygdala; supraoptic nucleus; globus pallidus; More reference expression data |
| BioGPS | n/a |
Gene ontology
| Molecular function | transmembrane transporter activity |
| Cellular component | membrane; integral component of membrane |
| Biological process | transmembrane transport |
Sources:Amigo / QuickGO
Orthologs
| Databases | NCBI: entry; OMA: entry |
| Species | Human | Mouse |
| Entrez | 222553 | 215085 |
| Ensembl | ENSG00000196376 | ENSMUSG00000038602 |
| UniProt | Q5T1Q4 | Q8BGK5 |
| RefSeq (mRNA) | NM_001029858 | NM_178675 |
| RefSeq (protein) | NP_001025029 | NP_848790 |
| Location (UCSC) | Chr 6: 117.91 – 118.32 Mb | Chr 10: 52.57 – 52.99 Mb |
| PubMed search |
- Wikidata
| View/Edit Human | View/Edit Mouse |

Solute carrier family 35, member F1 is a protein that in humans is encoded by the SLC35F1 gene. The gene is also known as C6orf169 or dJ230I3.1.
