= SLC22A24 =

Protein-coding gene in the species Homo sapiens

Identifiers
- Aliases: SLC22A24, NET46, solute carrier family 22 member 24
- External IDs: OMIM: 611698; MGI: 2442751; GeneCards: SLC22A24

Gene location (Human)
Chr.	Chromosome 11 (human)
Band	11q12.3	Start	63,079,940 bp
Band	11q12.3	End	63,144,221 bp

Gene location (Mouse)
Chr.	Chromosome 19 (mouse)
Band	19|19 A	Start	7,650,426 bp
Band	19|19 A	End	7,688,675 bp
RNA expression pattern
Bgee	Human / Mouse (ortholog); Top expressed in: buccal mucosa cell; human kidney; right lobe of liver; renal cortex / Top expressed in: right kidney; human kidney; proximal tubule; proximal straight tubule; proximal convoluted tubule; distal tubule; left lung lobe; visual cortex; primary visual cortex; sexually immature organism; More reference expression data
BioGPS	n/a
Gene ontology
Molecular function	sodium-independent organic anion transmembrane transporter activity; inorganic anion exchanger activity; urate transmembrane transporter activity
Cellular component	integral component of membrane; integral component of plasma membrane; membrane; plasma membrane
Biological process	sodium-independent organic anion transport; ion transport; transmembrane transport; inorganic anion transport; urate transport; organic anion transport
Sources:Amigo / QuickGO
Orthologs
Databases	NCBI: entry; OMA: entry
Species	Human	Mouse
Entrez	283238	207151
Ensembl	ENSG00000197658	ENSMUSG00000024757
UniProt	Q8N4F4	Q8VCA0
RefSeq (mRNA)	NM_001136506; NM_173586	NM_144785
RefSeq (protein)	NP_001129978; NP_775857	NP_659034
Location (UCSC)	Chr 11: 63.08 – 63.14 Mb	Chr 19: 7.65 – 7.69 Mb
PubMed search
- Wikidata
View/Edit Human	View/Edit Mouse

Solute carrier family 22 member 24 is a protein that in humans is encoded by the SLC22A24 gene.

== Function ==
SLC22A24 belongs to a large family of transmembrane proteins that function as uniporters, symporters, and antiporters to transport organic ions across cell membranes (Jacobsson et al., 2007 [PubMed 17714910]).
