= SLC17A9 =

Protein-coding gene in the species Homo sapiens

Identifiers
- Aliases: SLC17A9, C20orf59, VNUT, POROK8, solute carrier family 17 member 9
- External IDs: OMIM: 612107; MGI: 1919107; GeneCards: SLC17A9

Gene location (Human)
Chr.	Chromosome 20 (human)
Band	20q13.33	Start	62,952,707 bp
Band	20q13.33	End	62,969,585 bp

Gene location (Mouse)
Chr.	Chromosome 2 (mouse)
Band	2|2 H4	Start	180,367,056 bp
Band	2|2 H4	End	180,384,073 bp
RNA expression pattern
Bgee	Human / Mouse (ortholog); Top expressed in: right lobe of liver; stromal cell of endometrium; tendon of biceps brachii; spleen; pylorus; bone marrow cell; body of stomach; pancreatic ductal cell; lymph node; ascending aorta / Top expressed in: granulocyte; large intestine; colon; molar; left colon; mesenteric lymph nodes; embryo; spermatocyte; spleen; blood; More reference expression data
BioGPS	n/a
Gene ontology
Molecular function	transmembrane transporter activity; transporter activity
Cellular component	integral component of membrane; membrane
Biological process	anion transport; transmembrane transport; exocytosis
Sources:Amigo / QuickGO
Orthologs
Databases	NCBI: entry; OMA: entry
Species	Human	Mouse
Entrez	63910	228993
Ensembl	ENSG00000101194	ENSMUSG00000023393
UniProt	Q9BYT1	Q8VCL5
RefSeq (mRNA)	NM_001302643; NM_022082	NM_183161
RefSeq (protein)	NP_001289572; NP_071365	NP_898984
Location (UCSC)	Chr 20: 62.95 – 62.97 Mb	Chr 2: 180.37 – 180.38 Mb
PubMed search
- Wikidata
View/Edit Human	View/Edit Mouse

Solute carrier family 17 member 9 is a protein that in humans is encoded by the SLC17A9 gene.

== Function ==
This gene encodes a member of a family of transmembrane proteins that are involved in the transport of small molecules. The encoded protein participates in the vesicular uptake, storage, and secretion of adenoside triphosphate (ATP) and other nucleotides. A mutation in this gene was found in individuals with autosomal dominant disseminated superficial actinic porokeratosis-8. Alternative splicing results in multiple transcript variants.
