= SLC25A12 =

Protein found in humans

Identifiers
- Aliases: SLC25A12, AGC1, ARALAR, solute carrier family 25 member 12, EIEE39, DEE39
- External IDs: OMIM: 603667; MGI: 1926080; GeneCards: SLC25A12
Available structures
PDB	Ortholog search: PDBe RCSB
PDB	List of PDB id codes 4P60, 4P5X,%%s4P5X, 4P60

Gene location (Human)
Chr.	Chromosome 2 (human)
Band	2q31.1	Start	171,783,405 bp
Band	2q31.1	End	171,999,859 bp
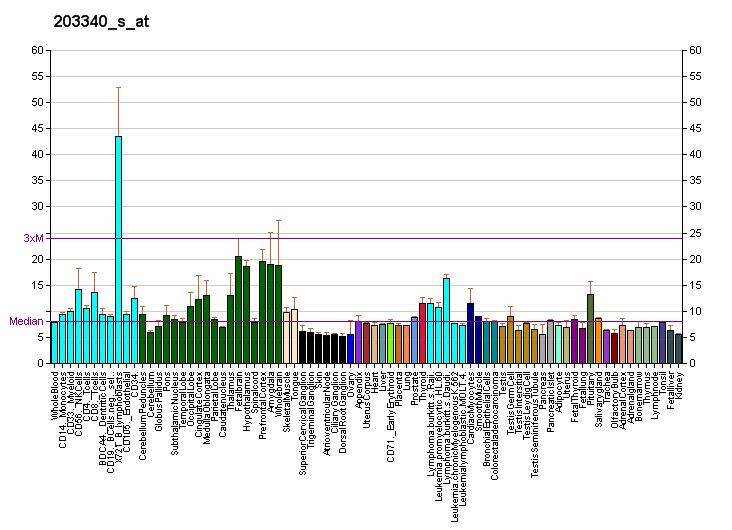

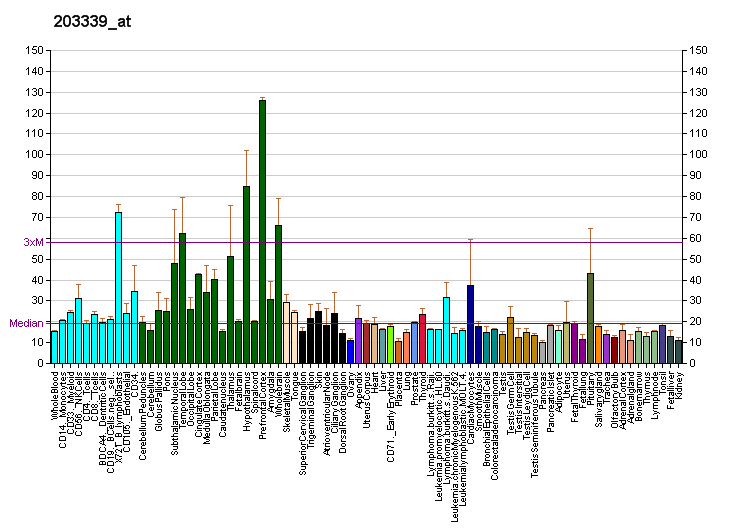
RNA expression pattern
Bgee	Human / Mouse (ortholog); Top expressed in: biceps brachii; Skeletal muscle tissue of biceps brachii; triceps brachii muscle; vastus lateralis muscle; muscle of thigh; myocardium of left ventricle; muscle of trunk; gastrocnemius muscle; thoracic diaphragm; Skeletal muscle tissue of rectus abdominis / n/a; More reference expression data
BioGPS	More reference expression data
Gene ontology
Molecular function	calcium ion binding; metal ion binding; L-aspartate transmembrane transporter activity; L-glutamate transmembrane transporter activity; acidic amino acid transmembrane transporter activity; transmembrane transporter activity; identical protein binding
Cellular component	membrane; myelin sheath; mitochondrion; mitochondrial inner membrane; integral component of membrane
Biological process	gluconeogenesis; malate-aspartate shuttle; response to calcium ion; transmembrane transport; aspartate transmembrane transport; L-glutamate transmembrane transport; transport; glutamate biosynthetic process; positive regulation of glucose metabolic process; positive regulation of myelination; L-aspartate transmembrane transport; negative regulation of glucose catabolic process to lactate via pyruvate; positive regulation of ATP biosynthetic process; mitochondrial calcium ion transmembrane transport
Sources:Amigo / QuickGO
Orthologs
Databases	NCBI: entry; OMA: entry
Species	Human	Mouse
Entrez	8604	78830
Ensembl	ENSG00000115840	n/a
UniProt	O75746	Q8BH59
RefSeq (mRNA)	NM_003705	NM_172436
RefSeq (protein)	NP_003696	NP_766024
Location (UCSC)	Chr 2: 171.78 – 172 Mb	n/a
PubMed search
- Wikidata
View/Edit Human	View/Edit Mouse

Calcium-binding mitochondrial carrier protein Aralar1 is a protein that in humans is encoded by the SLC25A12 gene. Aralar is an integral membrane protein located in the inner mitochondrial membrane. Its primary function as an antiporter is the transport of cytoplasmic glutamate with mitochondrial aspartate across the inner mitochondrial membrane, dependent on the binding of one calcium ion. Mutations in this gene cause early infantile epileptic encephalopathy 39 (EIEE39), symptomized by global hypomyelination of the central nervous system, refractory seizures, and neurodevelopmental impairment. This gene has connections to autism.

== Structure ==
The SLC25A12 gene is located on the q arm of chromosome 2 in position 31.1 and spans 110,902 base pairs. The gene produces a 74.8 kDa protein composed of 678 amino acids. The encoded protein, Aralar1, is a multi-pass membrane protein located in the inner mitochondrial membrane. The N-terminal half of this protein contains 2 imperfect EF-hand domains along with 3 canonical EF-hand calcium-binding domains; this part of the protein binds calcium in vitro. Aralar's C-terminal half shares 28-29% identity with other members of the mitochondrial solute carrier family, including SLC25A11, SLC25A5, SLC25A1, and has 6 putative transmembrane domains like the other members of mitochondrial solute carrier family.

== Function ==
The protein encoded by SLC25A12, Aralar1, is a mitochondrial calcium-binding carrier that facilitates the calcium-dependent exchange of cytoplasmic glutamate with mitochondrial aspartate across the mitochondrial inner membrane. Aralar binds to one calcium ion with high affinity. Upon calcium binding, the EF-hand-containing regulatory N-terminal domain binds to the C-terminal domain, opening a vestibule which allows the substrates to be translocated through the carrier domain. In the absence of calcium, the linker loop domain may close the vestibule, which may prevent substrates from entering the carrier domain. As a member of the malate-aspartate NADH shuttle, Aralar is also involved in the transfer of cytosolic reducing equivalents from the cytosol to the mitochondrial matrix. Aralar, along with the protein encoded by SLC25A13, are both calcium-binding aspartate/glutamate carriers which are substrates in the TIMM8A/TIMM13 complex.

== Clinical Significance ==
Overexpression of Aralar1 augments mitochondrial metabolism and increases insulin secretion in pancreatic cells. Aralar is expressed as both a 3.2 kb and 2.9 kb mRNA transcript in heart and skeletal muscle cells, and in lesser amounts in brain and kidney cells.

=== Epileptic Encephalopathy ===
Mutations in the SLC25A12 gene cause early infantile epileptic encephalopathy 39(EIEE39), characterized by refractory seizures, neurodevelopmental impairment, and poor prognosis. Development is normal prior to seizure onset, after which cognitive and motor delays become apparent. EIEE39 is characterized by global hypomyelination of the central nervous system, with the gray matter appearing relatively unaffected. Inheritance is autosomal recessive.

=== Autism ===
2 SNPs in introns 3 and 16 of the SLC25A12 gene may be associated with autism. In Brodmann's Area (BA) 46 of the prefrontal cortex, SLC25A12 is expressed more strongly in the neurons of autistic people. SLC25A12 overexpression may modify neuronal networks in certain subregions of the brain during the fetal development of autistic patients.

== Interactions ==
Aralar has interactions with SCO1, ATF2, COX14, COA3, in addition to 36 other proteins.

== See also ==
- Solute carrier family
