= Mitochondrial carrier =

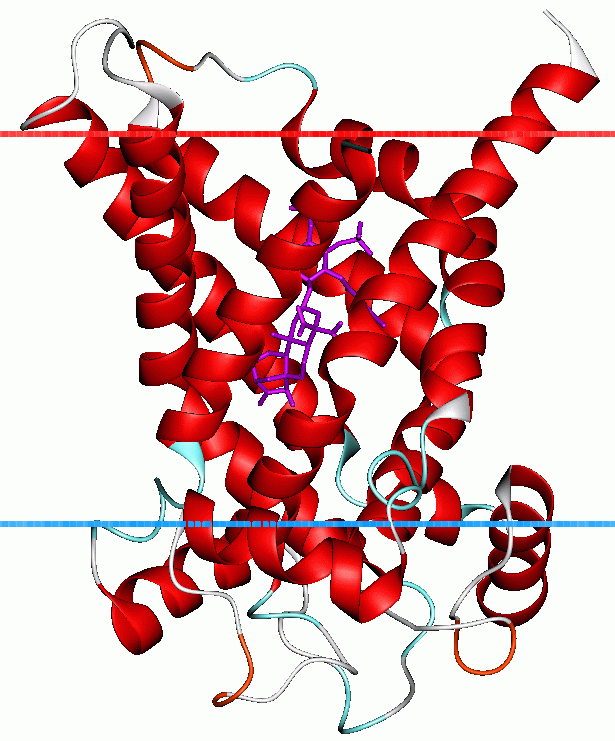
- Mitochondrial ADP/ATP carrier

Identifiers
- Symbol: Mito_carr
- Pfam: PF00153
- InterPro: IPR018108
- PROSITE: PDOC00189
- SCOP2: 1okc / SCOPe / SUPFAM
- TCDB: 2.A.29
- OPM superfamily: 21
- OPM protein: 1okc
Available protein structures:
- PDB: 2bmnA:9-104 2c3eA:112-206 1ymjA:112-206 1okcA:112-206 1ym6A:112-206 IPR018108 PF00153 (ECOD; PDBsum)
- AlphaFold: IPR018108; PF00153

MC Superfamily

Identifiers
- Symbol: ?
- InterPro: IPR023395
Available protein structures:
- PDB: IPR023395
- AlphaFold: IPR023395

Mitochondrial carriers are proteins from solute carrier family 25 which transfer molecules across the membranes of the mitochondria. Mitochondrial carriers are also classified in the Transporter Classification Database. The Mitochondrial Carrier (MC) Superfamily has been expanded to include both the original Mitochondrial Carrier (MC) family (TC# 2.A.29) and the Mitochondrial Inner/Outer Membrane Fusion (MMF) family (TC# 1.N.6).

== Phylogeny ==
Members of the MC family (SLC25) (TC# 2.A.29) are found exclusively in eukaryotic organelles although they are nuclearly encoded. Most are found in mitochondria, but some are found in peroxisomes of animals, in hydrogenosomes of anaerobic fungi, and in amyloplasts of plants.

SLC25 is the largest solute transporter family in humans. 53 members have been identified in human genome, 58 in A. thaliana and 35 in S. cerevisiae. The functions of approximately 30% of the human SLC25 proteins are unknown, but most of the yeast homologues have been functionally identified. See TCDB for functional assignments

== Function ==
Many MC proteins preferentially catalyze the exchange of one solute for another (antiport). A variety of these substrate carrier proteins, which are involved in energy transfer, have been found in the inner membranes of mitochondria and other eukaryotic organelles such as the peroxisome and facilitate the transport of inorganic ions, nucleotides, amino acids, keto acids and cofactors across the membrane. Such proteins include:

- ADP/ATP carrier protein (ADP-ATP translocase; i.e., TC# 2.A.29.1.2)
- 2-oxoglutarate/malate carrier protein (SLC25A11; TC# 2.A.29.2.11)
- phosphate carrier protein (SLC25A3; TC# 2.A.29.4.2)
- Tricarboxylate transport protein, mitochondrial (SLC25A1, or citrate transport protein; TC# 2.A.29.7.2)
- Graves disease carrier protein (SLC25A16; TC# 2.A.29.12.1)
- Yeast mitochondrial proteins MRS3 (TC# 2.A.29.5.1) and MRS4 (TC# 2.A.29.5.2)
- Yeast mitochondrial FAD carrier protein (TC# 2.A.29.10.1)
- As well as many others.

Functional aspects of these proteins, including metabolite transport, have been reviewed by Dr. Ferdinando Palmieri and Dr. Ciro Leonardo Pierri (2010). Diseases caused by defects of mitochondrial carriers are reviewed by Palmieri et al. (2008) and by Gutiérrez-Aguilar and Baines 2013. Mutations of mitochondrial carrier genes involved in mitochondrial functions other than oxidative phosphorylation are responsible for carnitine/acylcarnitine carrier deficiency, HHH syndrome, aspartate/glutamate isoform 2 deficiency, Amish microcephaly, and neonatal myoclonic epilepsy. These disorders are characterized by specific metabolic dysfunctions, depending on the physiological role of the affected carrier in intermediary metabolism. Defects of mitochondrial carriers that supply mitochondria with the substrates of oxidative phosphorylation, inorganic phosphate and ADP, are responsible for diseases characterized by defective energy production. Residues involved in substrate binding in the middle of the transporter and gating have been identified and analyzed.

== Structure ==
Permeases of the MC family (the human SLC25 family) possess six transmembrane α-helices. The proteins are of fairly uniform size of about 300 residues. They arose by tandem intragenic triplication in which a genetic element encoding two spanners gave rise to one encoding six spanners. This event may have occurred less than 2 billion years ago when mitochondria first developed their specialized endosymbiotic functions within eukaryotic cells. Members of the MC family are functional and structural monomers although early reports indicated that they are dimers.

Most MC proteins contain a primary structure exhibiting three repeats, each of about 100 amino acid residues in length, and both the N and C termini face the intermembrane space. All carriers contain a common sequence, referred to as the MCF motif, in each repeated region, with some variation in one or two signature sequences.

Amongst the members of the mitochondrial carrier family that have been identified, it is the ADP/ATP carrier (AAC; TC# 2.A.29.1.1) that is responsible for importing ADP into the mitochondria and exporting ATP out of the mitochondria and into the cytosol following synthesis. The AAC is an integral membrane protein that is synthesised lacking a cleavable presequence, but instead contains internal targeting information. It consists of a basket-shaped structure with six transmembrane helices that are tilted with respect to the membrane, 3 of them "kinked" due to the presence of prolyl residues.

Residues that are important for the transport mechanism are likely to be symmetrical, whereas residues involved in substrate binding will be asymmetrical reflecting the asymmetry of the substrates. By scoring the symmetry of residues in the sequence repeats, Robinson et al. (2008) identified the substrate-binding sites and salt bridge networks that are important for transport. The symmetry analyses provides an assessment of the role of residues and provides clues to the chemical identities of substrates of uncharacterized transporters.

There are structures of the mitochondrial ADP/ATP carrier in two different states. One is the cytoplasmic state, inhibited by carboxyatractyloside, in which the substrate binding site is accessible to the intermembrane space, which is confluent with the cytosol, i.e. the bovine mitochondrial ADP/ATP carrier PDB: 1OKC/PDB: 2C3E, the yeast ADP/ATP carrier Aac2p PDB: 4C9G/PDB: 4C9H, the yeast ADP/ATP carrier Aac3p PDB: 4C9J/PDB: 4C9Q, Another is the matrix state, inhibited by bongkrekic acid, in which the substrate binding site is accessible to the mitochondrial matrix, i.e. the fungal mitochondrial ADP/ATP carrier PDB: 6GCI. In addition, there are structures of the calcium regulatory domains of the mitochondrial ATP-Mg/Pi carrier in the calcium-bound state PDB: 4ZCU/PDB: 4N5X and mitochondrial aspartate/glutamate carriers in different regulatory states PDB: 4P5X/PDB: 4P60/PDB: 4P5W.

== Substrates ==
Mitochondrial carriers transport amino acids, keto acids, nucleotides, inorganic ions and co-factors through the mitochondrial inner membrane. The transporters consist of six transmembrane alpha-helices with threefold pseudo-symmetry.

The transported substrates of MC family members may bind to the bottom of the cavity, and translocation results in a transient transition from a 'pit' to a 'channel' conformation. An inhibitor of AAC, carboxyatractyloside, probably binds where ADP binds, in the pit on the outer surface, thus blocking the transport cycle. Another inhibitor, bongkrekic acid, is believed to stabilize a second conformation, with the pit facing the matrix. In this conformation, the inhibitor may bind to the ATP-binding site. Functional and structural roles for residues in the TMSs have been proposed. The mitochondrial carrier signature, Px[D/E]xx[K/R], of carriers is probably involved both in the biogenesis and in the transport activity of these proteins. A homologue has been identified in the mimivirus genome and shown to be a transporter for dATP and dTTP.

Examples of transported compounds include:

- citrate – SLC25A1
- ornithine – SLC25A2, SLC25A15
- phosphate – SLC25A3, SLC25A23, SLC25A24, SLC25A25
- adenine nucleotide – SLC25A4, SLC25A5, SLC25A6, SLC25A31
- dicarboxylate – SLC25A10
- oxoglutarate – SLC25A11
- glutamate – SLC25A22

== Examples ==
Human proteins containing this domain include:

- HDMCP, MCART1, MCART2, MCART6, MTCH1, MTCH2
- UCP1, UCP2, UCP3
- SLC25A1, SLC25A3, SLC25A4, SLC25A5, SLC25A6, SLC25A10, SLC25A11, SLC25A12, SLC25A13, SLC25A14, SLC25A16, SLC25A17, SLC25A18, SLC25A19, SLC25A21, SLC25A22, SLC25A23, SLC25A24, SLC25A25, SLC25A26, SLC25A27, SLC25A28, SLC25A29, SLC25A30, SLC25A31, SLC25A32, SLC25A33, SLC25A34, SLC25A35, SLC25A36, SLC25A37, SLC25A38, SLC25A39, SLC25A40, SLC25A41, SLC25A42, SLC25A43, SLC25A44, SLC25A45, SLC25A46, SLC25A48

Yeast Ugo1 is an example of the MMF family, but this protein has no human ortholog.
