= Cellular respiration =

Process of releasing energy from nutrients using inorganic electron acceptors

The metabolic pathways inside eukaryotic cells. Aerobic respiration takes place in the mitochondrion where oxygen is reduced into water. Glycolysis provides pyruvate and NADH to fuel the mitochondrial electron transport chain.

Cellular respiration is the process of oxidizing biological fuels using an inorganic electron acceptor, such as oxygen, to drive production of adenosine triphosphate (ATP), which stores chemical energy in a biologically accessible form. Cellular respiration may be described as a set of metabolic reactions and processes that take place in the cells to transfer chemical energy from nutrients to ATP, with the flow of electrons to an electron acceptor, and then release waste products.

If the electron acceptor is oxygen, the process is more specifically known as aerobic cellular respiration. If the electron acceptor is a molecule other than oxygen, this is anaerobic cellular respiration. Processes which transfer electrons to organic molecules are called fermentation, which is also an anaerobic process, but it is not respiration.

The reactions involved in respiration are catabolic reactions, which break large molecules into smaller ones, producing ATP. Respiration is one of the key ways a cell releases chemical energy to fuel cellular activity. The overall reaction occurs in a series of biochemical steps, some of which are redox reactions. Although cellular respiration is technically a combustion reaction, it is an unusual one because of the slow, controlled release of energy from the series of reactions.

Nutrients that are commonly used by animal and plant cells in respiration include sugar, amino acids and fatty acids, and the most common oxidizing agent is molecular oxygen (O_{2}). The chemical energy stored in ATP (the bond of its third phosphate group to the rest of the molecule can be broken, allowing more stable products to form, thereby releasing energy for use by the cell) can then be used to drive processes requiring energy, including biosynthesis, locomotion, or transportation of molecules across cell membranes.

== Aerobic respiration ==
Aerobic respiration requires oxygen (O_{2}) in order to create ATP. Although carbohydrates, fats, and proteins are consumed as reactants, aerobic respiration is the preferred method of pyruvate production in glycolysis, and requires pyruvate be transported by the mitochondria in order to be oxidized by the citric acid cycle. The products of this process are carbon dioxide and water, and the energy transferred is used to make bonds between ADP and a third phosphate group to form ATP (adenosine triphosphate), by substrate-level phosphorylation, NADH and FADH_{2}.

Mass balance of the global reaction:	C_{6}H_{12}O_{6} (s) + 6 O_{2} (g) → 6 CO_{2} (g) + 6 H_{2}O (l) + energy
	ΔG = −2880 kJ per mol of C_{6}H_{12}O_{6}

The negative ΔG indicates that the reaction is exothermic (exergonic) and can occur spontaneously.

The energy stored in NADH and FADH_{2} is used to generate additional ATP through an electron transport chain with oxygen and protons (hydrogen ions) as the "terminal electron acceptors". Most of the ATP produced by aerobic cellular respiration is made by oxidative phosphorylation. The energy released is used to create a chemiosmotic potential by pumping protons across a membrane. This potential is then used to drive ATP synthase and produce ATP from ADP and a phosphate group. Biology textbooks often state that 38 ATP molecules can be made per oxidized glucose molecule during cellular respiration (2 from glycolysis, 2 from the Krebs cycle, and about 34 from the electron transport system). However, this maximum yield is never quite reached because of losses due to leaky membranes as well as the cost of moving pyruvate and ADP into the mitochondrial matrix, and current estimates range around 29 to 30 ATP per glucose.

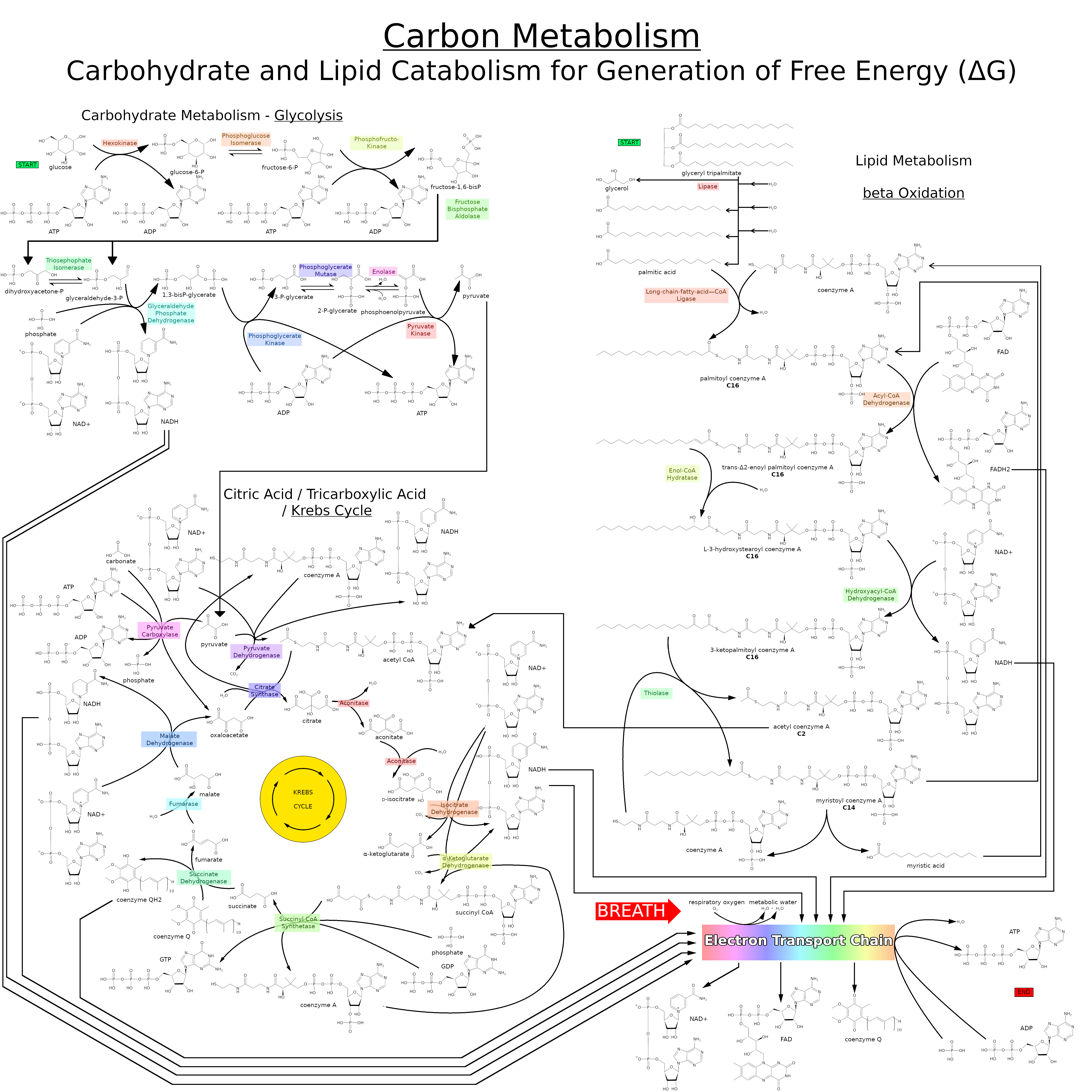
Carbon Catabolism pathway map for free energy including carbohydrate and lipid sources of energy

Aerobic metabolism is up to 15 times more efficient than anaerobic metabolism (which yields 2 molecules of ATP per 1 molecule of glucose). However, some anaerobic organisms, such as methanogens are able to continue with anaerobic respiration, yielding more ATP by using inorganic molecules other than oxygen as final electron acceptors in the electron transport chain. They share the initial pathway of glycolysis but aerobic metabolism continues with the Krebs cycle and oxidative phosphorylation. The post-glycolytic reactions take place in the mitochondria in eukaryotic cells, and in the cytoplasm in prokaryotic cells.

Although plants are net consumers of carbon dioxide and producers of oxygen via photosynthesis, plant respiration accounts for about half of the CO_{2} generated annually by terrestrial ecosystems.

=== Glycolysis ===
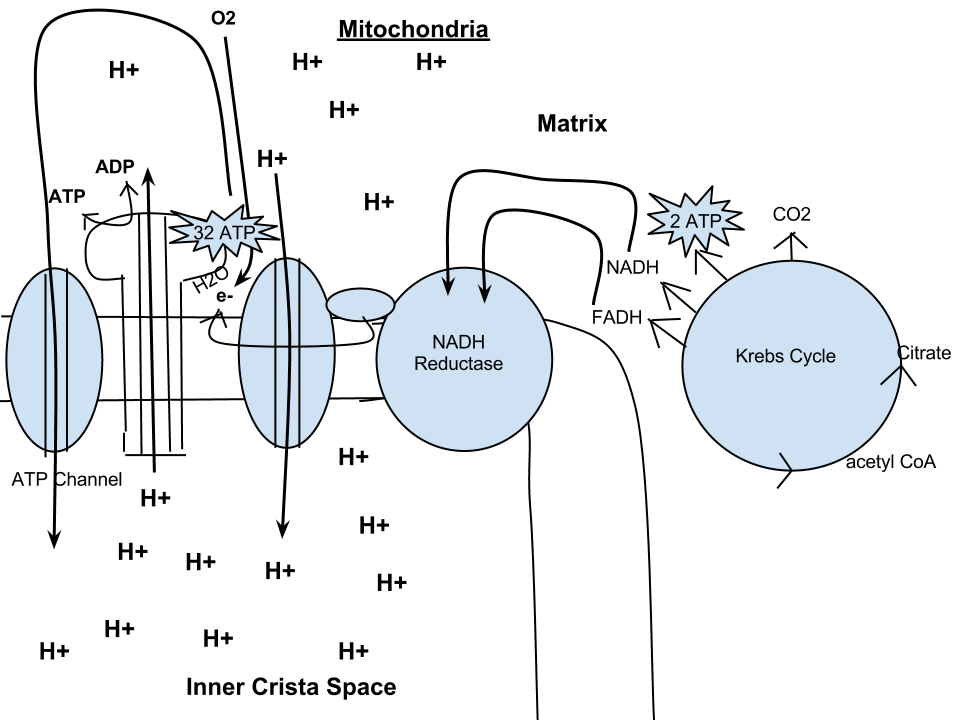
Out of the cytoplasm it goes into the Krebs cycle with the acetyl CoA. It then mixes with CO_{2} and makes 2 ATP, NADH, and FADH. From there the NADH and FADH go into the NADH reductase, which produces the enzyme. The NADH pulls the enzyme's electrons to send through the electron transport chain. The electron transport chain pulls H^{+} ions through the chain. From the electron transport chain, the released hydrogen ions make ADP for an result of 32 ATP. Lastly, ATP leaves through the ATP channel and out of the mitochondria.

Glycolysis is a metabolic pathway that takes place in the cytosol of cells in all living organisms. Glycolysis literally means "sugar splitting", and occurs regardless of oxygen's presence or absence. The process converts one molecule of glucose into two molecules of pyruvate (pyruvic acid), generating energy in the form of two net molecules of ATP. Four molecules of ATP per glucose are actually produced, but two are consumed as part of the preparatory phase. The initial phosphorylation of glucose is required to increase the reactivity (decrease its stability) in order for the molecule to be cleaved into two pyruvate molecules by the enzyme aldolase. During the pay-off phase of glycolysis, four phosphate groups are transferred to four ADP by substrate-level phosphorylation to make four ATP, and two NADH are also produced during the pay-off phase. The overall reaction can be expressed this way:

Glucose + 2 NAD^{+} + 2 P_{i} + 2 ADP → 2 pyruvate + 2 NADH + 2 ATP + 2 H^{+} + 2 H_{2}O + energy

Starting with glucose, 1 ATP is used to donate a phosphate to glucose to produce glucose 6-phosphate. Glycogen can be converted into glucose 6-phosphate as well with the help of glycogen phosphorylase. During energy metabolism, glucose 6-phosphate becomes fructose 6-phosphate. An additional ATP is used to phosphorylate fructose 6-phosphate into fructose 1,6-bisphosphate by the help of phosphofructokinase. Fructose 1,6-biphosphate then splits into two phosphorylated molecules with three carbon chains which later degrades into pyruvate.

=== Oxidative decarboxylation of pyruvate ===
Pyruvate is oxidized to acetyl-CoA and CO_{2} by the pyruvate dehydrogenase complex (PDC). The PDC contains multiple copies of three enzymes and is located in the mitochondria of eukaryotic cells and in the cytosol of prokaryotes. In the conversion of pyruvate to acetyl-CoA, one molecule of NADH and one molecule of CO_{2} is formed.

=== Citric acid cycle ===
The citric acid cycle is also called the Krebs cycle or the tricarboxylic acid cycle. When oxygen is present, acetyl-CoA is produced from the pyruvate molecules created from glycolysis. Once acetyl-CoA is formed, aerobic or anaerobic respiration can occur. When oxygen is present, the mitochondria will undergo aerobic respiration which leads to the Krebs cycle. However, if oxygen is not present, fermentation of the pyruvate molecule will occur. In the presence of oxygen, when acetyl-CoA is produced, the molecule then enters the citric acid cycle (Krebs cycle) inside the mitochondrial matrix, and is oxidized to CO_{2} while at the same time reducing NAD to NADH. NADH can be used by the electron transport chain to create further ATP as part of oxidative phosphorylation. To fully oxidize the equivalent of one glucose molecule, two acetyl-CoA must be metabolized by the Krebs cycle. Two low-energy waste products, H_{2}O and CO_{2}, are created during this cycle.

The citric acid cycle is an 8-step process involving 18 different enzymes and co-enzymes. During the cycle, acetyl-CoA (2 carbons) + oxaloacetate (4 carbons) yields citrate (6 carbons), which is rearranged to a more reactive form called isocitrate (6 carbons). Isocitrate is modified to become α-ketoglutarate (5 carbons), succinyl-CoA, succinate, fumarate, malate and, finally, oxaloacetate.

The net gain from one cycle is 3 NADH and 1 FADH_{2} as hydrogen (proton plus electron) carrying compounds and 1 high-energy GTP, which may subsequently be used to produce ATP. Thus, the total yield from 1 glucose molecule (2 pyruvate molecules) is 6 NADH, 2 FADH_{2}, and 2 ATP.

=== Oxidative phosphorylation ===
Diagram of oxidative phosphorylation

In eukaryotes, oxidative phosphorylation occurs in the mitochondrial cristae. It comprises the electron transport chain that establishes a proton gradient (chemiosmotic potential) across the boundary of the inner membrane by oxidizing the NADH produced from the Krebs cycle. ATP is synthesized by the ATP synthase enzyme when the chemiosmotic gradient is used to drive the phosphorylation of ADP. The electrons are finally transferred to exogenous oxygen and, with the addition of two protons, water is formed.

== Efficiency of ATP production ==
The table below describes the reactions involved when one glucose molecule is fully oxidized into carbon dioxide. It is assumed that all the reduced coenzymes are oxidized by the electron transport chain and used for oxidative phosphorylation.

Step	coenzyme yield	ATP yield	Source of ATP
Glycolysis preparatory phase		−2	Phosphorylation of glucose and fructose 6-phosphate uses two ATP from the cytoplasm.
Glycolysis pay-off phase		4	Substrate-level phosphorylation
Glycolysis pay-off phase	2 NADH	3 or 5	Oxidative phosphorylation: Each NADH produces net 1.5 ATP (instead of usual 2.5) due to NADH transport over the mitochondrial membrane
Oxidative decarboxylation of pyruvate	2 NADH	5	Oxidative phosphorylation
Krebs cycle		2	Substrate-level phosphorylation
Krebs cycle	6 NADH	15	Oxidative phosphorylation
Krebs cycle	2 FADH_{2}	3	Oxidative phosphorylation
Total yield		30 or 32 ATP	From the complete oxidation of one glucose molecule to carbon dioxide and oxidation of all the reduced coenzymes.

Although there is a theoretical yield of 38 ATP molecules per glucose during cellular respiration, such conditions are generally not realized because of losses such as the cost of moving pyruvate (from glycolysis), phosphate, and ADP (substrates for ATP synthesis) into the mitochondria. All are actively transported using carriers that utilize the stored energy in the proton electrochemical gradient.

- Pyruvate is taken up by a specific, low K_{m} transporter to bring it into the mitochondrial matrix for oxidation by the pyruvate dehydrogenase complex.
- The phosphate carrier (PiC) mediates the electroneutral exchange (antiport) of phosphate (H_{2}PO^{−}_{4}; P_{i}) for OH^{−} or symport of phosphate and protons (H^{+}) across the inner membrane, and the driving force for moving phosphate ions into the mitochondria is the proton motive force.
- The ATP-ADP translocase (also called adenine nucleotide translocase, ANT) is an antiporter and exchanges ADP and ATP across the inner membrane. The driving force is due to the ATP (−4) having a more negative charge than the ADP (−3), and thus it dissipates some of the electrical component of the proton electrochemical gradient.

The outcome of these transport processes using the proton electrochemical gradient is that more than 3 H^{+} are needed to make 1 ATP. Obviously, this reduces the theoretical efficiency of the whole process and the likely maximum is closer to 28–30 ATP molecules. In practice the efficiency may be even lower because the inner membrane of the mitochondria is slightly leaky to protons. Other factors may also dissipate the proton gradient creating an apparently leaky mitochondria. An uncoupling protein known as thermogenin is expressed in some cell types and is a channel that can transport protons. When this protein is active in the inner membrane it short circuits the coupling between the electron transport chain and ATP synthesis. The potential energy from the proton gradient is not used to make ATP but generates heat. This is particularly important in brown fat thermogenesis of newborn and hibernating mammals.

ATP synthase is a key enzyme in cellular respiration that produces ATP using the proton gradient in mitochondria. If temperature deviates too far from the optimal range, enzyme activity decreases, reducing ATP production. This limits the ability of effectors such as muscles and glands to function, threatening homeostasis.

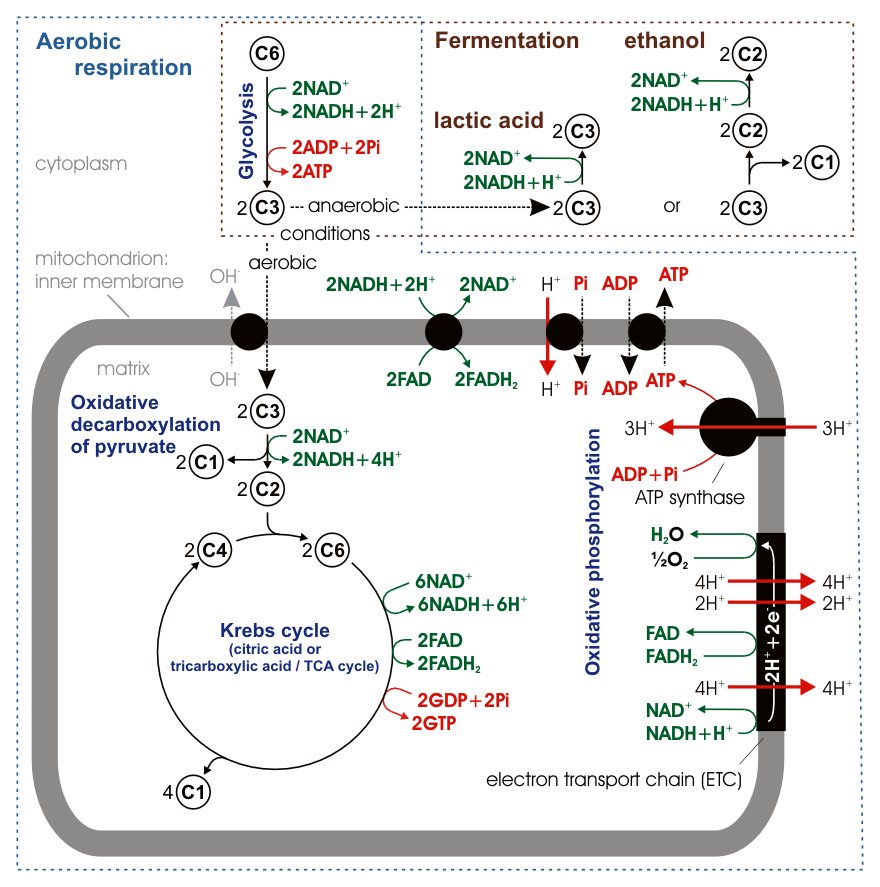
Stoichiometry of aerobic respiration and most known fermentation types in eucaryotic cell. Numbers in circles indicate counts of carbon atoms in molecules, C6 is glucose C_{6}H_{12}O_{6}, C1 carbon dioxide CO_{2}. Mitochondrial outer membrane is omitted.

According to some newer sources, the ATP yield during aerobic respiration is not 36–38, but only about 30–32 ATP molecules / 1 molecule of glucose, because:

- ATP : NADH+H^{+} and ATP : FADH_{2} ratios during the oxidative phosphorylation appear to be not 3 and 2, but 2.5 and 1.5 respectively. Unlike in the substrate-level phosphorylation, the stoichiometry here is difficult to establish.
  - ATP synthase produces 1 ATP / 3 H^{+}. However the exchange of matrix ATP for cytosolic ADP and Pi (antiport with OH^{−} or symport with H^{+}) mediated by ATP–ADP translocase and phosphate carrier consumes 1 H^{+} / 1 ATP as a result of regeneration of the transmembrane potential changed during this transfer, so the net ratio is 1 ATP : 4 H^{+}.
  - The mitochondrial electron transport chain proton pump transfers across the inner membrane 10 H^{+} / 1 NADH+H^{+} (4 + 2 + 4) or 6 H^{+} / 1 FADH_{2} (2 + 4).

So the final stoichiometry is
1 NADH+H^{+} : 10 H^{+} : 10/4 ATP = 1 NADH+H^{+} : 2.5 ATP
1 FADH_{2} : 6 H^{+} : 6/4 ATP = 1 FADH_{2} : 1.5 ATP

- ATP : NADH+H^{+} coming from glycolysis ratio during the oxidative phosphorylation is
  - 1.5, as for FADH_{2}, if hydrogen atoms (2H^{+}+2e^{−}) are transferred from cytosolic NADH+H^{+} to mitochondrial FAD by the glycerol phosphate shuttle located in the inner mitochondrial membrane.
  - 2.5 in case of malate-aspartate shuttle transferring hydrogen atoms from cytosolic NADH+H^{+} to mitochondrial NAD^{+}

So finally we have, per molecule of glucose

- Substrate-level phosphorylation: 2 ATP from glycolysis + 2 ATP (directly GTP) from Krebs cycle
- Oxidative phosphorylation
  - 2 NADH+H^{+} from glycolysis: 2 × 1.5 ATP (if glycerol phosphate shuttle transfers hydrogen atoms) or 2 × 2.5 ATP (malate-aspartate shuttle)
  - 2 NADH+H^{+} from the oxidative decarboxylation of pyruvate and 6 from Krebs cycle: 8 × 2.5 ATP
  - 2 FADH_{2} from the Krebs cycle: 2 × 1.5 ATP

Altogether this gives 4 + 3 (or 5) + 20 + 3 = 30 (or 32) ATP per molecule of glucose

These figures may still require further tweaking as new structural details become available. The above value of 3 H^{+} / ATP for the synthase assumes that the synthase translocates 9 protons, and produces 3 ATP, per rotation. The number of protons depends on the number of c subunits in the Fo c-ring, and it is now known that this is 10 in yeast Fo and 8 for vertebrates. Including one H^{+} for the transport reactions, this means that synthesis of one ATP requires 1 + 10/3 = 4.33 protons in yeast and 1 + 8/3 = 3.67 in vertebrates. This would imply that in human mitochondria the 10 protons from oxidizing NADH would produce 2.72 ATP (instead of 2.5) and the 6 protons from oxidizing succinate or ubiquinol would produce 1.64 ATP (instead of 1.5). This is consistent with experimental results within the margin of error described in a recent review.

The total ATP yield in ethanol or lactic acid fermentation is only 2 molecules coming from glycolysis, because pyruvate is not transferred to the mitochondrion and finally oxidized to the carbon dioxide (CO_{2}), but reduced to ethanol or lactic acid in the cytoplasm.

== Anaerobic respiration ==
Anaerobic respiration is used by microorganisms, either bacteria or archaea, in which neither oxygen (aerobic respiration) nor pyruvate derivatives (fermentation) are the final electron acceptor. Rather, an inorganic acceptor such as sulfate (SO^{2−}_{4}), nitrate (NO^{−}_{3}), or sulfur (S) is used. Such organisms are found in unusual environments such as underwater caves or near hydrothermal vents at the bottom of the ocean, in digestive tracts, as well as in anoxic soils or sediment in wetland ecosystems.

In July 2019, a scientific study of Kidd Mine in Canada discovered sulfur-breathing organisms which live 7900 feet (2400 meters) below the surface. These organisms are also remarkable because they consume minerals such as pyrite as their food source.

== See also ==
- Maintenance respiration: maintenance as a functional component of cellular respiration
- Microphysiometry
- Pasteur point
- Respirometry: research tool to explore cellular respiration
- Tetrazolium chloride: cellular respiration indicator
- Complex 1: NADH:ubiquinone oxidoreductes
