= PRPSAP2 =

Protein-coding gene in the species Homo sapiens

Available structures
PDB	Ortholog search: PDBe RCSB
PDB	List of PDB id codes 2JI4

Identifiers
- Aliases: PRPSAP2, PAP41, phosphoribosyl pyrophosphate synthetase associated protein 2
- External IDs: OMIM: 603762; MGI: 2384838; HomoloGene: 2073; GeneCards: PRPSAP2; OMA:PRPSAP2 - orthologs

Gene location (Human)
Chr.	Chromosome 17 (human)
Band	17p11.2	Start	18,840,085 bp
Band	17p11.2	End	18,931,287 bp

Gene location (Mouse)
Chr.	Chromosome 11 (mouse)
Band	11|11 B2	Start	61,620,476 bp
Band	11|11 B2	End	61,652,914 bp
RNA expression pattern
Bgee	Human / Mouse (ortholog); Top expressed in: ganglionic eminence; ventricular zone; C1 segment; cerebellar hemisphere; right hemisphere of cerebellum; pons; lymph node; inferior ganglion of vagus nerve; corpus callosum; tonsil / Top expressed in: secondary oocyte; ganglionic eminence; ventricular zone; epiblast; zygote; morula; primary oocyte; layer of retina; neural layer of retina; blastocyst; More reference expression data
BioGPS	n/a
Gene ontology
Molecular function	ribose phosphate diphosphokinase activity; enzyme inhibitor activity; magnesium ion binding; protein binding; enzyme regulator activity
Cellular component	ribose phosphate diphosphokinase complex; cytoplasm; protein-containing complex
Biological process	nucleotide biosynthetic process; bone development; nucleobase-containing compound metabolic process; negative regulation of catalytic activity; nucleoside metabolic process; 5-phosphoribose 1-diphosphate biosynthetic process; purine nucleotide biosynthetic process; regulation of catalytic activity
Sources:Amigo / QuickGO
Orthologs
Species	Human	Mouse
Entrez	5636	212627
Ensembl	ENSG00000141127	ENSMUSG00000020528
UniProt	O60256	Q8R574
RefSeq (mRNA)	NM_001243936; NM_001243940; NM_001243941; NM_001243942; NM_002767 NM_001353096; NM_001353097; NM_001353098; NM_001353099; NM_001353100; NM_001353101; NM_001353102; NM_001353103; NM_001353104; NM_001353105; NM_001353106; NM_001353107	NM_001164242; NM_001164243; NM_001164244; NM_144806; NM_001364086 NM_001364087; NM_001364088; NM_001364090
RefSeq (protein)	NP_001230865; NP_001230869; NP_001230870; NP_001230871; NP_002758 NP_001340025; NP_001340026; NP_001340027; NP_001340028; NP_001340029; NP_001340030; NP_001340031; NP_001340032; NP_001340033; NP_001340034; NP_001340035; NP_001340036	NP_001157714; NP_001157715; NP_001157716; NP_659055; NP_001351015 NP_001351016; NP_001351017; NP_001351019
Location (UCSC)	Chr 17: 18.84 – 18.93 Mb	Chr 11: 61.62 – 61.65 Mb
PubMed search
- Wikidata
View/Edit Human	View/Edit Mouse

Phosphoribosyl pyrophosphate synthetase-associated protein 2 is a protein that in humans is encoded by the PRPSAP2 gene.

== Function ==
The enzyme phosphoribosyl pyrophosphate synthetase (PRS) catalyzes the formation of phosphoribosyl pyrophosphate which is a substrate for synthesis of purine and pyrimidine nucleotides, histidine, tryptophan and NAD. PRS exists as a complex with two catalytic subunits and two associated subunits. This gene encodes a non-catalytic associated subunit of PRS.
