= MTCH1 =

Protein-coding gene in the species Homo sapiens

Identifiers
- Aliases: MTCH1, CGI-64, PIG60, PSAP, SLC25A49, mitochondrial carrier 1
- External IDs: OMIM: 610449; MGI: 1929261; GeneCards: MTCH1

Gene location (Human)
Chr.	Chromosome 6 (human)
Band	6p21.2	Start	36,965,807 bp
Band	6p21.2	End	36,986,298 bp

Gene location (Mouse)
Chr.	Chromosome 17 (mouse)
Band	17|17 A3.3	Start	29,551,046 bp
Band	17|17 A3.3	End	29,566,908 bp
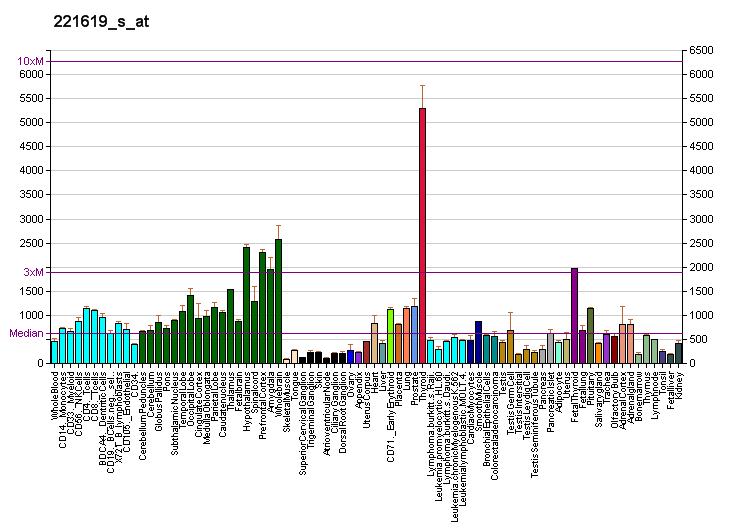
RNA expression pattern
Bgee	Human / Mouse (ortholog); Top expressed in: endothelial cell; Brodmann area 23; middle temporal gyrus; inferior olivary nucleus; pancreatic ductal cell; dorsal motor nucleus of vagus nerve; entorhinal cortex; corpus epididymis; Epithelium of choroid plexus; superior frontal gyrus / Top expressed in: saccule; dentate gyrus of hippocampal formation granule cell; vestibular membrane of cochlear duct; otic placode; otic vesicle; superior frontal gyrus; dorsomedial hypothalamic nucleus; lateral septal nucleus; molar; ventricular zone; More reference expression data
BioGPS	More reference expression data
Gene ontology
Molecular function	protein binding
Cellular component	integral component of membrane; intracellular anatomical structure; mitochondrial inner membrane; mitochondrion; membrane
Biological process	regulation of signal transduction; apoptotic process; positive regulation of apoptotic process; neuronal ion channel clustering; activation of cysteine-type endopeptidase activity involved in apoptotic process
Sources:Amigo / QuickGO
Orthologs
Databases	NCBI: entry; OMA: entry
Species	Human	Mouse
Entrez	23787	56462
Ensembl	ENSG00000137409	ENSMUSG00000024012
UniProt	Q9NZJ7	Q791T5
RefSeq (mRNA)	NM_001271641; NM_014341	NM_019880; NM_001347335; NM_001357762; NM_001357763
RefSeq (protein)	NP_001258570; NP_055156	NP_001334264; NP_063933; NP_001344691; NP_001344692
Location (UCSC)	Chr 6: 36.97 – 36.99 Mb	Chr 17: 29.55 – 29.57 Mb
PubMed search
- Wikidata
View/Edit Human	View/Edit Mouse

Mitochondrial carrier homolog 1 (MTCH1), also referred to as presenilin 1-associated protein (PSAP), is a protein that in humans is encoded by the MTCH1 gene on chromosome 6. MTCH1 is a proapoptotic mitochondrial protein potentially involved in Alzheimer's disease (AD).

== Structure ==
The protein encoded by this gene is named for its structural resemblance to the members of the mitochondrial carrier protein family. The MTCH1 gene contains 12 exons and produces four isoforms. These isoforms arise from alternative splicing of exon 8 and two potential start codons, which results in the deletion of 17 amino acid residues in the hydrophilic loop between two transmembrane domains of some isoforms. Though they differ in sequence and length, the four isoforms still share a similar topological structure, including six transmembrane domains, one of which is responsible for localization to the outer mitochondrial membrane (OMM), and two N-terminal apoptotic domains. As a result, all four isoforms retain these apoptotic domains and mitochondrial localization, both of which are required for the protein's proapoptotic function.

== Function ==
MTCH1 is a proapoptotic protein that localizes to the OMM and induces apoptosis independently of BAX and BAK. One possible mechanism proposes that its interactions with the mitochondrial permeability transition pore (MPTP) complex leads to depolarization of the mitochondrial membrane, release of cytochrome C, and activation of caspase-3. Expression of this protein is observed in 16 different tissue types, indicating that the protein may serve a housekeeping function.

== Clinical significance ==
MTCH1 may be associated with AD and other neurodegenerative and neuroinflammatory diseases through its close interaction with presenilin. However, more research is required to confirm its clinical involvement.

== Interactions ==
MTCH1 has been shown to interact with PS1.
