= SLC25A16 =

Protein-coding gene in the species Homo sapiens

Identifiers
- Aliases: SLC25A16, D10S105E, GDA, GDC, HGT.1, ML7, hML7, solute carrier family 25 member 16
- External IDs: OMIM: 139080; MGI: 1920382; GeneCards: SLC25A16

Gene location (Human)
Chr.	Chromosome 10 (human)
Band	10q21.3	Start	68,477,998 bp
Band	10q21.3	End	68,527,523 bp

Gene location (Mouse)
Chr.	Chromosome 10 (mouse)
Band	10|10 B4	Start	62,756,412 bp
Band	10|10 B4	End	62,782,277 bp
RNA expression pattern
Bgee	Human / Mouse (ortholog); Top expressed in: jejunal mucosa; right lobe of liver; adipose tissue; gonad; mammary gland; lactiferous gland; epithelium of colon; lactiferous duct; corpus epididymis; duodenum / Top expressed in: left lobe of liver; human kidney; right kidney; Epithelium of choroid plexus; parotid gland; retinal pigment epithelium; lacrimal gland; otolith organ; utricle; seminal vesicula; More reference expression data
BioGPS	n/a
Gene ontology
Molecular function	antiporter activity; secondary active transmembrane transporter activity; transmembrane transporter activity
Cellular component	membrane; mitochondrion; mitochondrial inner membrane; integral component of membrane
Biological process	transmembrane transport; mitochondrial transport
Sources:Amigo / QuickGO
Orthologs
Databases	NCBI: entry; OMA: entry
Species	Human	Mouse
Entrez	8034	73132
Ensembl	ENSG00000122912	ENSMUSG00000071253
UniProt	P16260	Q8C0K5
RefSeq (mRNA)	NM_152707; NM_001324312; NM_001324313; NM_001324314; NM_001324315 NM_001324317	NM_175194
RefSeq (protein)	NP_001311241; NP_001311242; NP_001311243; NP_001311244; NP_001311246 NP_689920	NP_780403
Location (UCSC)	Chr 10: 68.48 – 68.53 Mb	Chr 10: 62.76 – 62.78 Mb
PubMed search
- Wikidata
View/Edit Human	View/Edit Mouse

Solute carrier family 25 (mitochondrial carrier; Graves disease autoantigen), member 16 is a protein in humans that is encoded by the SLC25A16 gene.

This gene encodes a protein that contains three tandemly repeated mitochondrial carrier protein domains. The encoded protein is localized in the inner membrane and facilitates the rapid transport and exchange of molecules between the cytosol and the mitochondrial matrix space. This gene has a possible role in Graves' disease. [provided by RefSeq, Jul 2008].
