= Mitoferrin-1 =

Protein-coding gene in the species Homo sapiens

SLC25A37

Identifiers
- Aliases: SLC25A37, MFRN, MFRN1, MSC, MSCP, PRO1278, PRO1584, PRO2217, HT015, solute carrier family 25 member 37
- External IDs: OMIM: 610387; MGI: 1914962; GeneCards: SLC25A37

Gene location (Human)
Chr.	Chromosome 8 (human)
Band	8p21.2	Start	23,528,956 bp
Band	8p21.2	End	23,575,463 bp

Gene location (Mouse)
Chr.	Chromosome 14 (mouse)
Band	14|14 D2	Start	69,479,297 bp
Band	14|14 D2	End	69,522,561 bp
RNA expression pattern
Bgee	Human / Mouse (ortholog); Top expressed in: trabecular bone; blood; bone marrow; monocyte; vena cava; mucosa of paranasal sinus; sperm; jejunal mucosa; duodenum; pericardium / Top expressed in: fetal liver hematopoietic progenitor cell; human fetus; blood; tibiofemoral joint; umbilical cord; body of femur; spleen; atrioventricular valve; atrium; granulocyte; More reference expression data
BioGPS	n/a
Gene ontology
Molecular function	iron ion transmembrane transporter activity; transmembrane transporter activity
Cellular component	membrane; mitochondrion; mitochondrial inner membrane; integral component of membrane
Biological process	ion transport; iron ion homeostasis; mitochondrial transport; iron import into the mitochondrion
Sources:Amigo / QuickGO
Orthologs
Databases	NCBI: entry; OMA: entry
Species	Human	Mouse
Entrez	51312	67712
Ensembl	ENSG00000147454	ENSMUSG00000034248
UniProt	Q9NYZ2	Q920G8
RefSeq (mRNA)	NM_016612; NM_001317812; NM_001317813; NM_001317814; NM_018579 NM_018586	NM_026331; NM_030054
RefSeq (protein)	NP_001304741; NP_001304742; NP_001304743; NP_057696	NP_080607
Location (UCSC)	Chr 8: 23.53 – 23.58 Mb	Chr 14: 69.48 – 69.52 Mb
PubMed search
- Wikidata
View/Edit Human	View/Edit Mouse

Mitoferrin-1 (Mfrn1) is a 38 kDa protein that is encoded by the SLC25A37 gene in humans. It is a member of the Mitochondrial carrier (MC) Superfamily, however, its metal cargo makes it distinct from other members of this family. Mfrn1 plays a key role in mitochondrial iron homeostasis as an iron transporter, importing ferrous iron from the intermembrane space of the mitochondria to the mitochondrial matrix for the biosynthesis of heme groups and Fe-S clusters. This process is tightly regulated, given the redox potential of Mitoferrin's iron cargo. Mfrn1 is paralogous to Mitoferrin-2 (Mfrn2), a 39 kDa protein encoded by the SLC25A28 gene in humans. Mfrn1 is highly expressed in differentiating erythroid cells and in other tissues at low levels, while Mfrn2 is expressed ubiquitously in non-erythroid tissues.

== Function ==
The molecular details of iron trafficking for heme and Iron-sulfur cluster synthesis are still unclear, however, Mitoferrin-1 has been shown to form oligomeric complexes with the ATP-binding cassette transporter ABCB10 and Ferrochelatase (or protoporphyrin ferrochelatase). Furthermore, ABC10 binding enhances the stability and functionality of Mfrn1, suggesting that transcriptional and post-translational mechanisms further regulate cellular and mitochondrial iron homeostasis. Recombinant Mfrn1 in vitro has micromolar affinity for the following first-row transition metals: iron (II), manganese (II), cobalt (II), and nickel (II). Mfrn1 iron transport was reconstituted in proteoliposomes, where the protein was also able to transport manganese, cobalt, copper, and zinc, yet it discriminated against nickel, despite the aforementioned affinity. Notably, Mfrn1 appears to transport free iron ions as opposed to any sort of chelated iron complex. Additionally, Mfrn1 selects against divalent alkali ions. Mfrn1 and its paralog Mfrn2 have complementary functionalities, though the precise relationship is still uncertain. For example, heme production is restored by expression of Mfrn2 in cells silenced for Mfrn1 and by ectopic expression of Mfrn1 in nonerythroid cells silenced for Mfrn2, where Mfrn1 accumulates due to an increased protein half-life. In contrast, ectopic expression of Mfrn2 failed to restore heme product in erythroid cells silenced for Mfrn1 because Mfrn2 was unable to accumulate in mitochondria.

== Clinical Significance ==
Mitoferrin-1 has been implicated in diseases associated with defective iron homeostasis, resulting in iron or porphyrin imbalances. Abnormal Mfrn1 expression, for example, may contribute to Erythropoietic protoporphyria, a porphyrin disease linked to mutations in the Ferrochelatase enzyme. Selective deletion of Mfrn1 in adult mice led to severe anemia rather than porphyria likely because Iron-responsive element-binding protein (specifically IRE-BP1) transcriptionally regulates porphyrin biogenesis, inhibiting it in the absence of Mfrn1. Mfrn1 has also been implicated in depression and myelodysplastic syndrome.

== Animal Studies ==
The importance of Mitoferrins in heme and Fe-S cluster biosynthesis was first discovered in the anemic zebrafish mutant frascati. Studies in mice revealed that total deletion of Mfrn1 resulted in embryonic lethality, while selective deletion in adults caused severe anemia as stated above. Expression mouse Mfrn1 rescued knockout zebrafish, indicating that the gene is highly evolutionarily conserved. The transcription factor, GATA-1, directly regulates Mfrn1 expression in zebrafish via distal cis-regulatory Mfrn1 elements. In C. elegans, reduced Mfrn1 expression results in abnormal development and increased lifespans of roughly 50-80%.

== See also ==
- Solute carrier family
