= SLC25A29 =

Protein-coding gene in humans

Identifiers
- Aliases: SLC25A29, C14orf69, CACL, ORNT3, solute carrier family 25 member 29
- External IDs: OMIM: 615064; MGI: 2444911; GeneCards: SLC25A29

Gene location (Human)
Chr.	Chromosome 14 (human)
Band	14q32.2	Start	100,291,116 bp
Band	14q32.2	End	100,306,547 bp

Gene location (Mouse)
Chr.	Chromosome 12 (mouse)
Band	12|12 F1	Start	108,791,799 bp
Band	12|12 F1	End	108,801,809 bp
RNA expression pattern
Bgee	Human / Mouse (ortholog); Top expressed in: right uterine tube; right lobe of thyroid gland; left lobe of thyroid gland; C1 segment; tibial nerve; pancreatic ductal cell; olfactory zone of nasal mucosa; anterior pituitary; left ovary; nucleus accumbens / Top expressed in: gastrula; decidua; seminal vesicula; lacrimal gland; salivary gland; internal carotid artery; cheek; parotid gland; retinal pigment epithelium; masseter muscle; More reference expression data
BioGPS	n/a
Gene ontology
Molecular function	amino acid transmembrane transporter activity; high-affinity L-arginine transmembrane transporter activity; high-affinity lysine transmembrane transporter activity; basic amino acid transmembrane transporter activity; acyl carnitine transmembrane transporter activity; transmembrane transporter activity
Cellular component	membrane; integral component of membrane; mitochondrial inner membrane; mitochondrion
Biological process	transmembrane transport; acyl carnitine transport; mitochondrial transport; ornithine transport; carnitine transport; L-histidine transmembrane transport; acyl carnitine transmembrane transport; L-lysine transmembrane transport; mitochondrial L-ornithine transmembrane transport; amino acid transport
Sources:Amigo / QuickGO
Orthologs
Databases	NCBI: entry; OMA: entry
Species	Human	Mouse
Entrez	123096	214663
Ensembl	ENSG00000197119	ENSMUSG00000021265
UniProt	Q8N8R3	Q8BL03
RefSeq (mRNA)	NM_001039355; NM_001291813; NM_001291814; NM_152333; NM_001352820 NM_001352821; NM_001352822; NM_001352823	NM_181328
RefSeq (protein)	NP_001034444; NP_001278742; NP_001278743; NP_689546; NP_001339749 NP_001339750; NP_001339751; NP_001339752	NP_851845
Location (UCSC)	Chr 14: 100.29 – 100.31 Mb	Chr 12: 108.79 – 108.8 Mb
PubMed search
- Wikidata
View/Edit Human	View/Edit Mouse

Solute carrier family 25, member 29 is a protein that in humans is encoded by the SLC25A29 gene. The gene is also known as CACL and C14orf69. SLC25A29 belongs to a protein family of solute carriers called the mitochondrial carriers.
