= TIMM8A =

Protein-coding gene in humans

Identifiers
- Aliases: TIMM8A, DDP, DDP1, DFN1, MTS, TIM8, translocase of inner mitochondrial membrane 8 homolog A (yeast), translocase of inner mitochondrial membrane 8A
- External IDs: OMIM: 300356; MGI: 1353433; GeneCards: TIMM8A

Gene location (Human)
Chr.	X chromosome (human)
Band	Xq22.1	Start	101,345,661 bp
Band	Xq22.1	End	101,348,742 bp

Gene location (Mouse)
Chr.	X chromosome (mouse)
Band	X E3|X 56.18 cM	Start	133,438,005 bp
Band	X E3|X 56.18 cM	End	133,442,614 bp
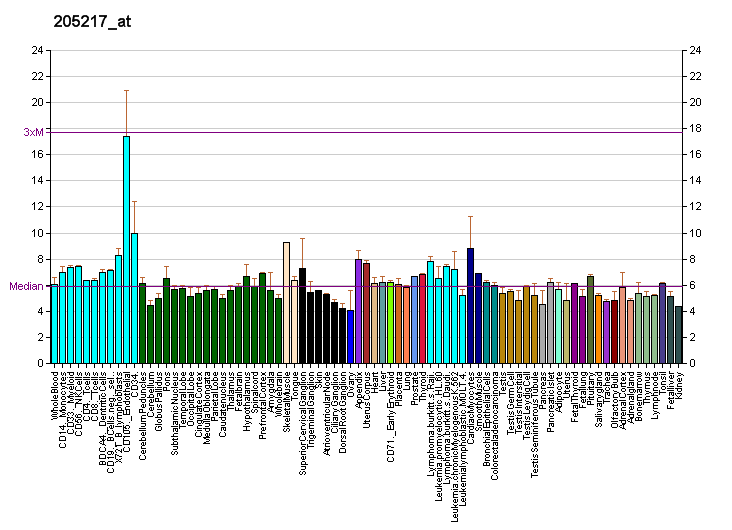
RNA expression pattern
Bgee	Human / Mouse (ortholog); Top expressed in: endothelial cell; gonad; mucosa of transverse colon; right lobe of liver; islet of Langerhans; left ventricle; rectum; muscle of leg; muscle of thigh; gastrocnemius muscle / Top expressed in: embryo; morula; embryo; tail of embryo; right kidney; yolk sac; blastocyst; ventricular zone; genital tubercle; proximal tubule; More reference expression data
BioGPS	More reference expression data
Gene ontology
Molecular function	protein binding; metal ion binding
Cellular component	mitochondrial inner membrane; mitochondrial intermembrane space; mitochondrion; membrane
Biological process	protein transport; nervous system development; transport
Sources:Amigo / QuickGO
Orthologs
Databases	NCBI: entry; OMA: entry
Species	Human	Mouse
Entrez	1678	30058
Ensembl	ENSG00000126953	ENSMUSG00000048007
UniProt	O60220	Q9WVA2
RefSeq (mRNA)	NM_032696; NM_001145951; NM_004085	NM_013898
RefSeq (protein)	NP_001139423; NP_004076	NP_038926
Location (UCSC)	Chr X: 101.35 – 101.35 Mb	Chr X: 133.44 – 133.44 Mb
PubMed search
- Wikidata
View/Edit Human	View/Edit Mouse

Mitochondrial import inner membrane translocase subunit Tim8 A, also known as deafness-dystonia peptide or protein, is an enzyme that in humans is encoded by the TIMM8A gene. This translocase has similarity to yeast mitochondrial proteins that are involved in the import of metabolite transporters from the cytoplasm into the mitochondrial inner membrane. The gene is mutated in deafness-dystonia syndrome (or Mohr-Tranebjaerg syndrome; MTS/DFN-1) and it is postulated that MTS/DFN-1 is a mitochondrial disease caused by a defective mitochondrial protein import system.

== Structure ==
The TIMM8A gene is located on q arm of chromosome X in position 22.1 and spans 3,313 base pairs. The gene produces an 11 kDa protein composed of 97 amino acids. The structure shows resemblance to yeast translocase of the inner membrane (TIM) proteins with two conserved paired cysteine residue motifs. The cysteine residues organize zinc ions for stability and control other interactions with proteins.

== Function ==
The human TIMM8A gene codes for a translocase involved in the import and insertion of hydrophobic membrane proteins from the cytoplasm into the mitochondrial inner membrane. It is also required for the transfer of beta-barrel precursors from the TOM complex to the sorting and assembly machinery (SAM complex) of the outer membrane. It acts as a chaperone-like protein that protects the hydrophobic precursors from aggregation and guide them through the mitochondrial intermembrane space. The TIMM8-TIMM13 complex mediates the import of proteins such as TIMM23, SLC25A12/ARALAR1 and SLC25A13/ARALAR2, while the predominant TIMM9-TIMM10 70 kDa complex mediates the import of much more proteins. TIMM8A has been implicated as a required element in normal neurologic development.

== Clinical significance ==
Mutation of TIMM8A is associated with Mohr-Tranebjaerg syndrome or deafness-dystonia syndrome, a mitochondrial disease postulated to be associated with a defective mitochondrial protein import system.Mohr-Tranebjaerg syndrome is a recessive, X-linked neurodegenerative syndrome characterized by early-onset deafness followed by progressive dystonia in adulthood, progressive sensorineural hearing loss, mental retardation, dysphagia, paranoia, and optic atrophy. It is known to be caused by a truncation or deletion of the 11 kDa protein product of TIMM8A. Defects in this gene also cause Jensen syndrome, an X-linked disease with opticoacoustic nerve atrophy and muscle weakness.

A 39-year-old Japanese male patient with a nonsense mutation of the CGA codon 80 of exon 2 by TGA in the TIMM8A gene was diagnosed with deafness-dystonia syndrome. Signs and symptoms included sensorineural deafness, dystonia, blepharospasm, brisk deep tendon reflexes and personality changes. However, there were no visual or sensory disturbances. The mother was found to be a heterozygous carrier for the mutation. Another patient, an 11-year-old Dutch child with a de novo missense mutation (C66W; c.233C > G) in the TIMM8A gene, was diagnosed with sensorineural hearing impairment associated with Deafness-dystonia syndrome. Signs and symptoms included hyperreflexia, dyspraxia, synkinesis, atrophy, and progressive dystonia. A third patient, a 30-year-old male with Deafness-dystonia syndrome, was found to have a novel 108delG mutation in the TIMM8A gene. Signs and symptoms were generalized dystonia, scoliosis, blepharospasm, and involuntary movements of the head and neck. There are many more cases of mutations in the TIMM8A gene with varying symptoms, commonly including dystonia, mental deficiency, sensorineural hearing loss, optic atrophy, and others.

== Interactions ==
TIMM8A has been shown to interact with Signal transducing adaptor molecule and TIMM13. Three copies of TIMM8A and three copies of TIMM13 assemble to form a 70 kDa TIMM8-TIMM13 Complex with heterohexamer structure in the intermembrane space. The TIMM8-TIMM13 Complex associates with the TIM22 complex whose core is composed of TIMM22 to import and assemble inner membrane proteins.
