= SLC25A1 =

Mammalian protein found in Homo sapiens

Identifiers
- Aliases: SLC25A1, CTP, D2L2AD, SEA, SLC20A3, solute carrier family 25 member 1, CMS23
- External IDs: OMIM: 190315; MGI: 1345283; GeneCards: SLC25A1

Gene location (Human)
Chr.	Chromosome 22 (human)
Band	22q11.21	Start	19,175,581 bp
Band	22q11.21	End	19,178,739 bp

Gene location (Mouse)
Chr.	Chromosome 16 (mouse)
Band	16 A3|16 11.11 cM	Start	17,743,087 bp
Band	16 A3|16 11.11 cM	End	17,746,083 bp
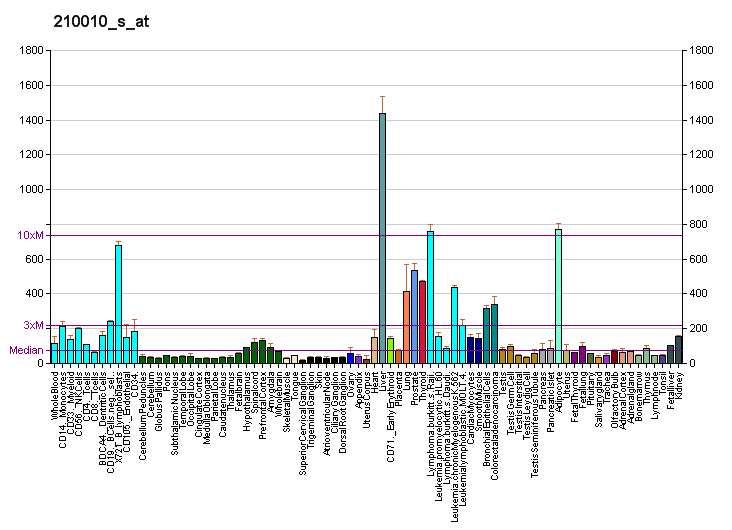
RNA expression pattern
Bgee	Human / Mouse (ortholog); Top expressed in: mucosa of transverse colon; right lobe of liver; right adrenal cortex; left adrenal cortex; mucosa of ileum; duodenum; left coronary artery; stromal cell of endometrium; popliteal artery; tibial arteries / Top expressed in: brown adipose tissue; lactiferous gland; facial motor nucleus; left lobe of liver; subcutaneous adipose tissue; right kidney; otolith organ; adrenal gland; utricle; lip; More reference expression data
BioGPS	More reference expression data
Gene ontology
Molecular function	citrate transmembrane transporter activity; tricarboxylic acid transmembrane transporter activity; transmembrane transporter activity; citrate secondary active transmembrane transporter activity
Cellular component	extracellular exosome; membrane; mitochondrion; nucleus; mitochondrial inner membrane; integral component of membrane
Biological process	gluconeogenesis; transmembrane transport; tricarboxylic acid transmembrane transport; mitochondrial citrate transmembrane transport; fatty-acyl-CoA biosynthetic process; mitochondrial transport; transport
Sources:Amigo / QuickGO
Orthologs
Databases	NCBI: entry; OMA: entry
Species	Human	Mouse
Entrez	6576	13358
Ensembl	ENSG00000100075	ENSMUSG00000003528
UniProt	P53007	Q8JZU2
RefSeq (mRNA)	NM_001256534; NM_001287387; NM_005984	NM_153150
RefSeq (protein)	NP_001243463; NP_001274316; NP_005975; NP_001243463.1; NP_001274316.1	NP_694790
Location (UCSC)	Chr 22: 19.18 – 19.18 Mb	Chr 16: 17.74 – 17.75 Mb
PubMed search
- Wikidata
View/Edit Human	View/Edit Mouse

Tricarboxylate transport protein, mitochondrial, also known as tricarboxylate carrier protein and citrate transport protein (CTP), is a protein that in humans is encoded by the SLC25A1 gene. SLC25A1 belongs to the mitochondrial carrier gene family SLC25. High levels of the tricarboxylate transport protein are found in the liver, pancreas and kidney. Lower or no levels are present in the brain, heart, skeletal muscle, placenta and lung.

The tricarboxylate transport protein is located within the inner mitochondria membrane. It provides a link between the mitochondrial matrix and cytosol by transporting citrate through the impermeable inner mitochondrial membrane in exchange for malate from the cytosol. The citrate transported out of the mitochondrial matrix by the tricarboxylate transport protein is catalyzed by citrate lyase to acetyl CoA, the starting material for fatty acid biosynthesis, and oxaloacetate. As well, cytosolic NADPH + H^{+} necessary for fatty acid biosynthesis is generated in the reduction of oxaloacetate to malate and pyruvate by malate dehydrogenase and the malic enzyme. For these reasons, the tricarboxylate transport protein is considered to play a key role in fatty acid synthesis.

== Structure ==
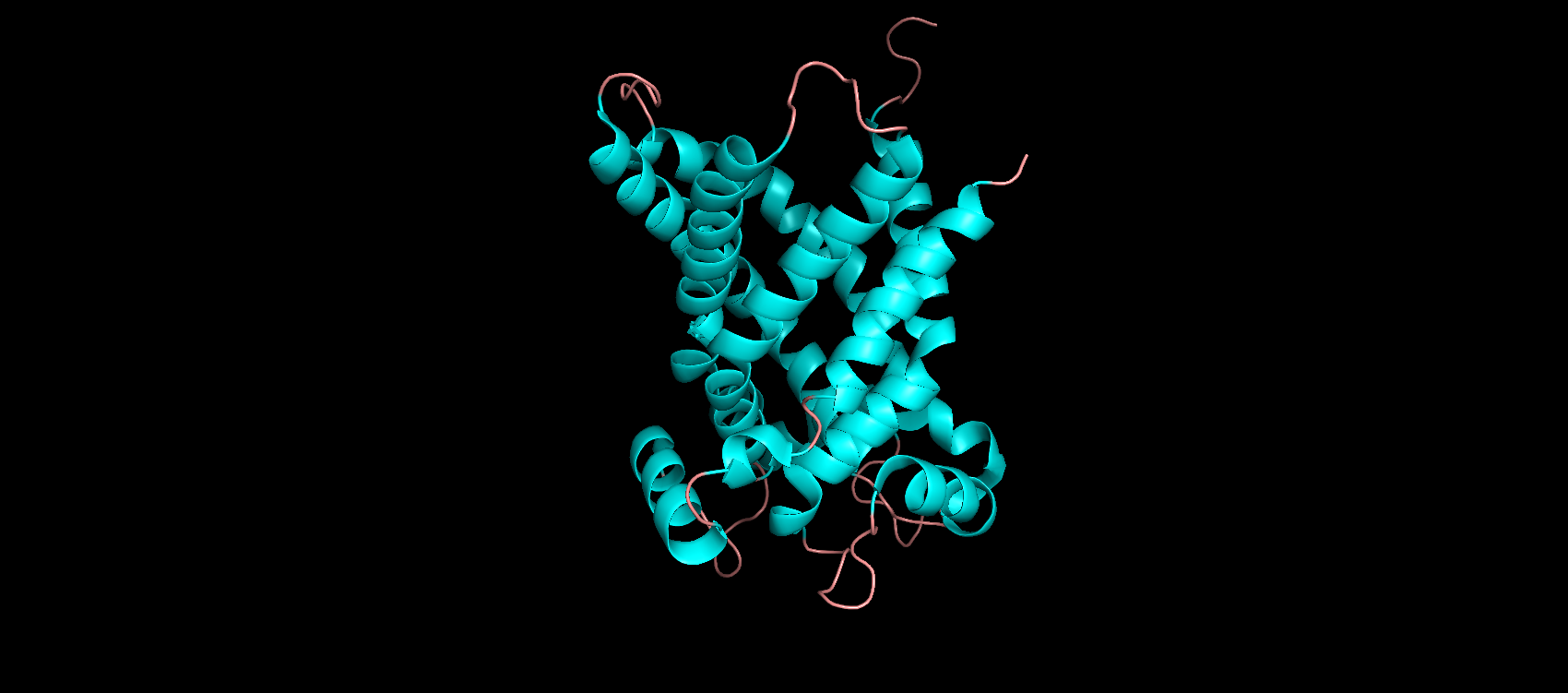
A 3D cartoon depiction of the tripartite structure of a mitochondrial transport protein, generated from 23CE bovine mitochondrial ADP-ATP carrier

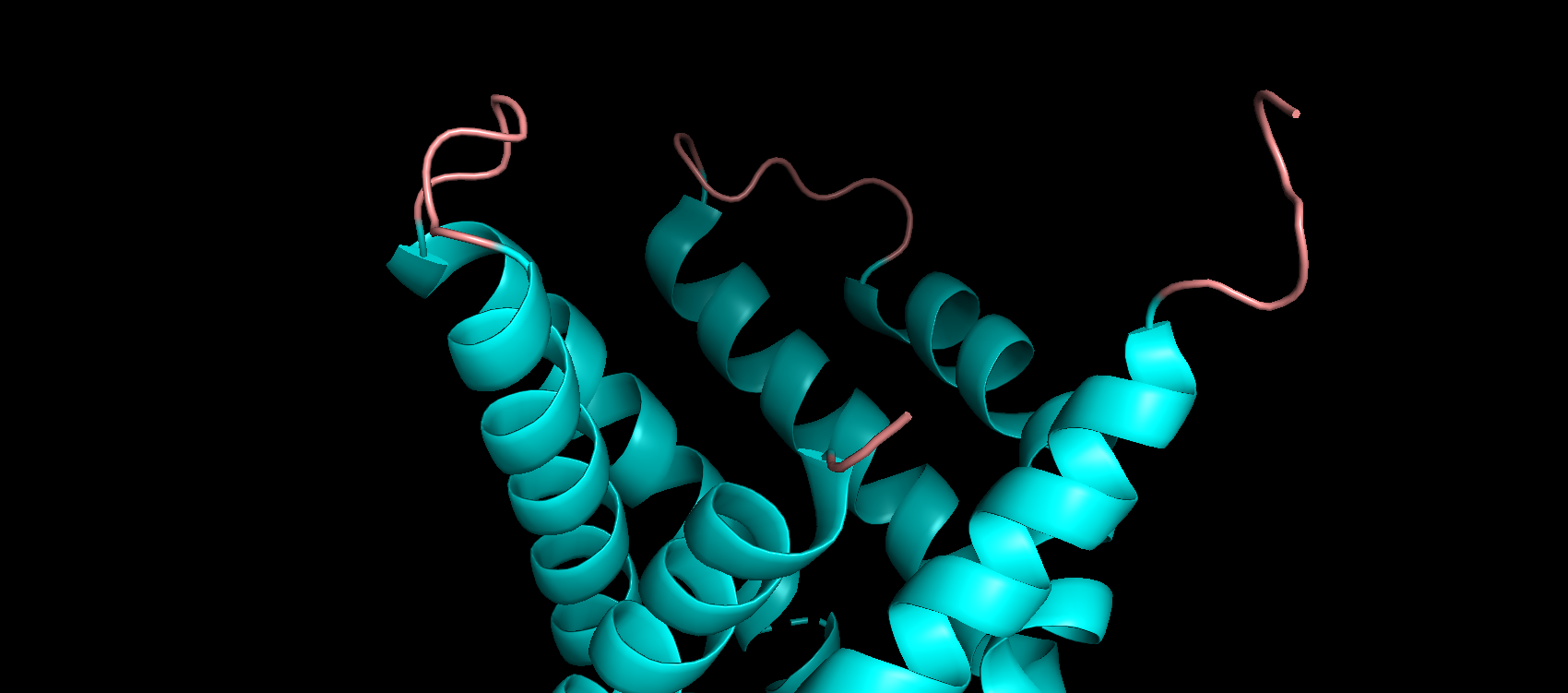
A zoomed in image of the C and N termini and the two loops linking the repeated domains on the cytoplasmic side of the inner mitochondrial membrane.

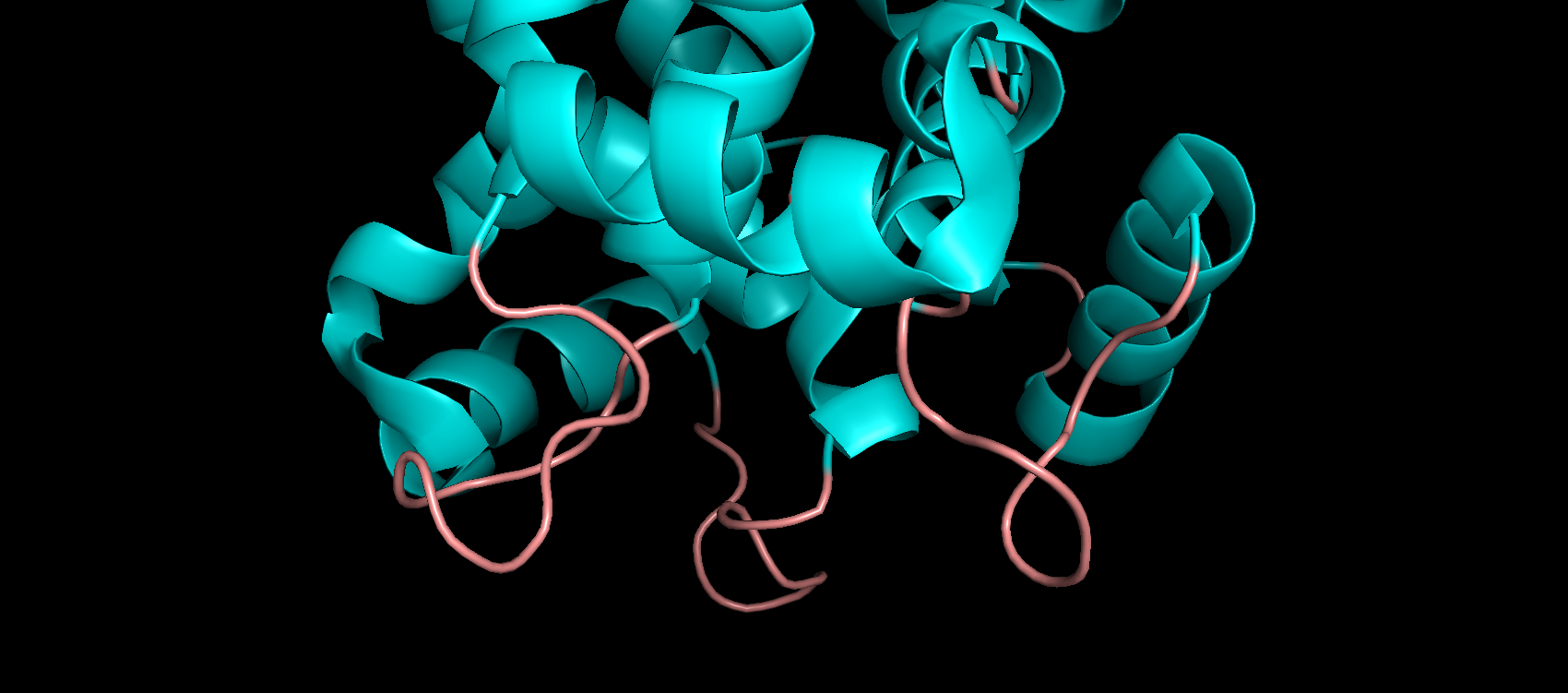
A zoomed in image of the three loops linking the two α-helices of each repeated domain located on the matrix side of the membrane.

The structure of the tricarboxylate transport protein is consistent with the structures of other mitochondrial carriers. In particular, the tricarboxylate transport protein has a tripartite structure consisting of three repeated domains that are approximately 100 amino acids in length. Each repeat forms a transmembrane domain consisting of two hydrophobic α-helices. The amino and carboxy termini are located on the cytosolic side of the inner mitochondrial membrane. Each domain is linked by two hydrophilic loops located on the cytosolic side of the membrane. The two α-helices of each repeated domain are connected by hydrophilic loops located on the matrix side of the membrane. A salt bridge network is present on both the matrix side and cytoplasmic side of the tricarboxylate transport protein.

== Transport mechanism ==
The tricarboxylate transport protein exists in two states: a cytoplasmic state where it accepts malate from the cytoplasm and a matrix state where it accepts citrate from the mitochondrial matrix. A single binding site is present near the center of the cavity of the tricarboxylate transport protein, which can be either exposed to the cytosol or the mitochondrial matrix depending on the state. A substrate induced conformational change occurs when citrate enters from the matrix side and binds to the central cavity of the tricarboxylate transport protein. This conformational change opens a gate on the cytosolic side and closes the gate on the matrix side. Likewise, when malate enters from the cytosolic side, the matrix gate opens and the cytosolic gate closes. Each side of the transporter is open and closed by the disruption and formation of the salt bridge networks, which allows access to the single binding site.

== Disease relevance ==
Mutations in this gene have been associated with the inborn error of metabolism combined D-2- and L-2-hydroxyglutaric aciduria, which was the first reported case of a pathogenic mutation of the SLC25A1 gene. Patients with D-2/L-2-hydroxyglutaric aciduria display neonatal onset metabolic encephalopathy, infantile epilepsy, global developmental delay, muscular hypotonia and early death. It is believed low levels of citrate in the cytosol and high levels of citrate in the mitochondria caused by the impaired citrate transport plays a role in the disease. In addition, increased expression of the tricarboxylate transport protein has been linked to cancer and the production of inflammatory mediators. Therefore, it has been suggested that inhibition of the tricarboxylate transport protein may have a therapeutic effect in chronic inflammation diseases and cancer.

== See also ==
- SLC25A1+protein,+human at the U.S. National Library of Medicine Medical Subject Headings (MeSH)
