= SLC25A48 =

Protein-coding gene in humans

Identifiers
- Aliases: SLC25A48, solute carrier family 25 member 48
- External IDs: OMIM: 616150; MGI: 2145373; GeneCards: SLC25A48

Gene location (Human)
Chr.	Chromosome 5 (human)
Band	5q31.1	Start	135,579,202 bp
Band	5q31.1	End	135,889,770 bp

Gene location (Mouse)
Chr.	Chromosome 13 (mouse)
Band	13|13 B1	Start	56,586,168 bp
Band	13|13 B1	End	56,622,052 bp
RNA expression pattern
Bgee	Human / Mouse (ortholog); Top expressed in: tibial nerve; sural nerve; amygdala; tibia; hypothalamus; caudate nucleus; putamen; cingulate gyrus; anterior cingulate cortex; right frontal lobe / Top expressed in: zygote; secondary oocyte; primary oocyte; transitional epithelium of urinary bladder; lumbar spinal ganglion; fallopian tube; right kidney; uterus; left lobe of liver; embryo; More reference expression data
BioGPS	n/a
Gene ontology
Molecular function	protein binding; L-ornithine transmembrane transporter activity; transmembrane transporter activity; acyl carnitine transmembrane transporter activity
Cellular component	membrane; mitochondrion; mitochondrial inner membrane; integral component of membrane
Biological process	transmembrane transport; mitochondrial transport; L-ornithine transmembrane transport; acyl carnitine transport; acyl carnitine transmembrane transport
Sources:Amigo / QuickGO
Orthologs
Databases	NCBI: entry; OMA: entry
Species	Human	Mouse
Entrez	153328	328258
Ensembl	ENSG00000145832	ENSMUSG00000021509
UniProt	Q6ZT89	Q8BW66
RefSeq (mRNA)	NM_145282; NM_001349335; NM_001349336; NM_001349345	NM_177809
RefSeq (protein)	NP_660325; NP_001336264; NP_001336265; NP_001336274	NP_808477
Location (UCSC)	Chr 5: 135.58 – 135.89 Mb	Chr 13: 56.59 – 56.62 Mb
PubMed search
- Wikidata
View/Edit Human	View/Edit Mouse

Solute carrier family 25 member 48 is a protein that in humans is encoded by the SLC25A48 gene. This gene encodes a mitochondrial choline carrier. Mutations in this gene are associated with serum choline levels and impact betaine synthesis.

The protein is expressed in the inner membrane of the mitochondria and enriched in brown adipose tissue.
