= Arts syndrome =

- Other names: ataxia-deafness-optic atrophy, lethal; ataxia - fatal x-linked with deafness and loss of vision
- This condition is inherited in an X-linked recessive manner.

Arts syndrome is a rare metabolic disorder that causes serious neurological problems in males due to a malfunction of the PRPP synthetase 1 enzyme. Arts syndrome is part of a spectrum of PRPS-1 related disorders with reduced activity of the enzyme that includes Charcot–Marie–Tooth disease and X-linked non-syndromic sensorineural deafness.

== Signs and symptoms ==
Males show more serious symptoms than females affected by this disorder. The symptoms for males are:

- Profound sensorineural hearing loss, i.e., a complete or almost complete loss of hearing caused by abnormalities in the inner ear.
- Weak muscle tone – hypotonia.
- Impaired muscle coordination – ataxia.
- Developmental delay.
- Intellectual disability.
- Vision loss caused by optic nerve atrophy in early childhood.
- Peripheral neuropathy.
- Recurrent infections, especially in the respiratory system.
- Muscle weakness caused by recurrent infections.

Symptoms for females:

Very rarely seen hearing loss that begins in adulthood (age > 20 years) combined with ataxia and neuropathy. Optic atrophy and retinitis pigmentosa also observed in some cases.

== Cause ==
Arts syndrome is caused by a loss of function mutation in the PRPS1 gene. The PRPS1 gene codes for the enzyme phosphoribosyl pyrophosphate synthetase 1 or PRPP synthetase 1. This enzyme is involved in producing purines and pyrimidines which are the building blocks of DNA, RNA, ATP and other molecules. The mutations that cause Arts syndrome replace single amino acids the PRPP synthetase 1 enzyme. The resulting enzyme is unstable. Disruption of purine and pyrimidine production may impair energy storage and transport in cells. Impairment of these processes may have a particularly severe effect on tissues that require a large amount of energy, such as the nervous system, resulting in the neurological problems characteristic of Arts syndrome. The reason for the increased risk of respiratory infections in Arts syndrome is unclear.

Novel missense mutation - c.367C>G (p.His123Asp)

c.455T→C (p. L152P), c.398A→C (p.Q133P)

p. Ile275Thr and p.Gly306Glu

== Genetics ==
Arts syndrome follows an X-linked inheritance. In males (who have only one X chromosome), a mutation in the only copy of the gene in each cell causes the disorder. In females (who have two X chromosomes), a mutation in one of the two copies of the gene in each cell sometimes causes features of the disorder; in other cases, these females do not experience any symptoms. In the small number of Arts syndrome cases that have been identified, affected individuals have inherited the mutation from a mother who carries an altered copy of the PRPS1 gene. If the mother is a carrier, the chance of transmitting the PRPS1 mutation in each pregnancy is 50%. Males who inherit the mutation will be affected; females who inherit the mutation will be carriers and may or may not be mildly affected. Males with Arts syndrome do not reproduce.

Charcot-Marie-Tooth disease-5, Arts syndrome and X-linked nonsyndromic sensorineural deafness present three clinically distinct but genetically allelic disorders, caused by reduced phosphoribosylpyrophosphate synthetase 1 (PRS1) activity due to PRPS1 mutations. Only three families with CMTX5 and two families Arts syndrome, respectively, have been reported worldwide so far. Thus, evidence is still rare whether these two disorders are separate entities, or rather clusters on a phenotypic continuum of PRPS1-related disease.

== Diagnosis ==
Arts syndrome should be included in the differential diagnosis of infantile hypotonia and weakness aggravated by recurrent infection with a family history of X-linked inheritance. Sequence analysis of PRPS1, the only gene associated with Arts syndrome, has detected mutations in both kindreds reported to date. Arts syndrome patients were also found to have reduced levels of hypoxanthine levels in urine and uric acid levels in the serum. In vitro, PRS-1 activity was reduced in erythrocytes and fibroblasts.

== Treatment ==
Currently, purine replacement via S-adenosylmethionine (SAM) supplementation in people with Arts syndrome appears to improve their condition. This suggests that SAM supplementation can alleviate symptoms of PRPS1 deficient patients by replacing purine nucleotides and open new avenues of therapeutic intervention. Other non-clinical treatment options include educational programs tailored to their individual needs. Sensorineural hearing loss has been treated with cochlear implantation with good results. Ataxia and visual impairment from optic atrophy are treated in a routine manner. Routine immunizations against common childhood infections and annual influenza immunization can also help prevent any secondary infections from occurring.

Regular neuropsychological, audiologic, and ophthalmologic examinations are also recommended. Carrier testing for at-risk relatives and prenatal testing for pregnancies at increased risk are possible if the disease-causing mutation in the family is known.
