= Ribose-phosphate diphosphokinase =

Class of enzymes

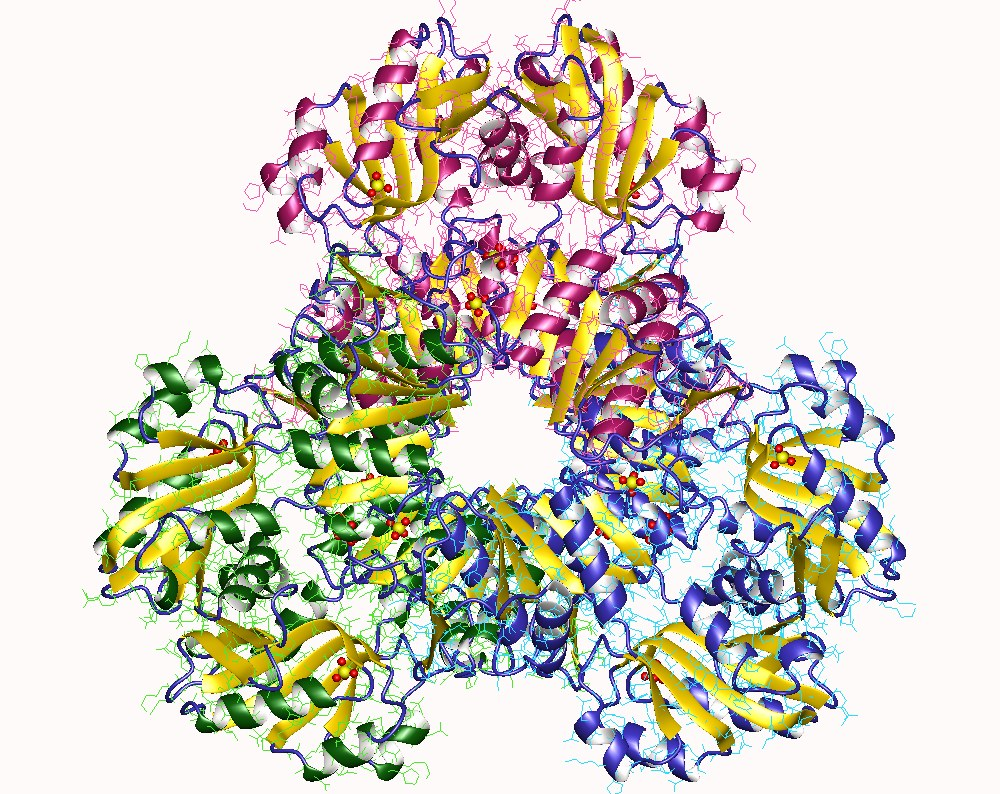
- Phosphoribosyl pyrophosphate synthase 1, hexamer, Human

Identifiers
- EC no.: 2.7.6.1
- CAS no.: 9031-46-3

Databases
- BRENDA: enzyme data
- ExPASy: NiceZyme view
- KEGG: enzyme entry
- MetaCyc: metabolic pathway
- Rhea: reactions
- PDB structures: RCSB PDB PDBe PDBsum
- Gene Ontology: AmiGO / QuickGO
Search
- PMC: articles
- PubMed: articles
- NCBI: proteins

phosphoribosyl pyrophosphate synthetase 1

Identifiers
- Symbol: PRPS1
- NCBI gene: 5631
- HGNC: 9462
- OMIM: 311850
- RefSeq: NM_002764
- UniProt: P60891

Other data
- EC number: 2.7.6.1
- Locus: Chr. X q21-q27
Search for
- Structures: Swiss-model
- Domains: InterPro

phosphoribosyl pyrophosphate synthetase 2

Identifiers
- Symbol: PRPS2
- NCBI gene: 5634
- HGNC: 9465
- OMIM: 311860
- RefSeq: NM_002765
- UniProt: P11908

Other data
- EC number: 2.7.6.1
- Locus: Chr. X pter-q21
Search for
- Structures: Swiss-model
- Domains: InterPro

Ribose-phosphate diphosphokinase (or phosphoribosyl pyrophosphate synthetase or ribose-phosphate pyrophosphokinase) is an enzyme that converts ribose 5-phosphate into phosphoribosyl pyrophosphate (PRPP). It is classified under EC 2.7.6.1.

The enzyme is involved in the synthesis of nucleotides (purines and pyrimidines), cofactors NAD and NADP, and amino acids histidine and tryptophan, linking these biosynthetic processes to the pentose phosphate pathway, from which the substrate ribose 5-phosphate is derived. Ribose 5-phosphate is produced by the pentose phosphate pathway from Glucose-6-Phosphate. The product phosphoribosyl pyrophosphate acts as an essential component of the purine salvage pathway and the de novo synthesis of purines. Dysfunction of the enzyme would thereby undermine purine metabolism. Ribose-phosphate pyrophosphokinase exists in bacteria, plants, and animals, and there are three isoforms of human ribose-phosphate pyrophosphokinase. In humans, the genes encoding the enzyme are located on the X chromosome.

== Reaction mechanism ==
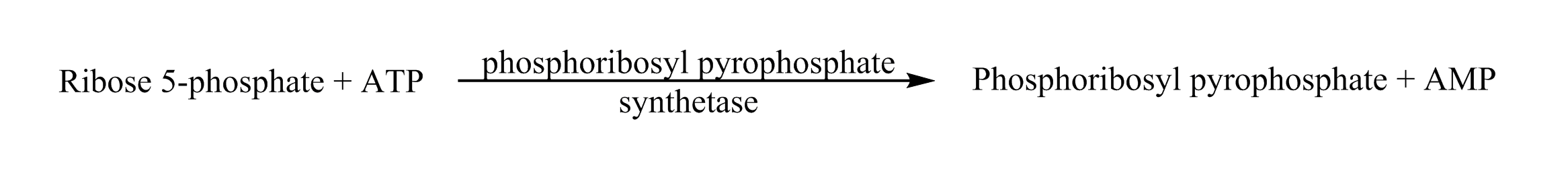
Overall reaction for phosphoribosyl pyrophosphate synthetase

Ribose-phosphate diphosphokinase transfers the diphosphoryl group from Mg-ATP (Mg^{2+} coordinated to ATP) to ribose 5-phosphate. The enzymatic reaction begins with the binding of ribose 5-phosphate, followed by binding of Mg-ATP to the enzyme. In the transition state upon binding of both substrates, the diphosphate is transferred. The enzyme first releases AMP before releasing the product phosphoribosyl pyrophosphate. Experiments using oxygen 18 labelled water demonstrate that the reaction mechanism proceeds with the nucleophilic attack of the anomeric hydroxyl group of ribose 5-phosphate on the beta-phosphorus of ATP in an SN2 reaction.

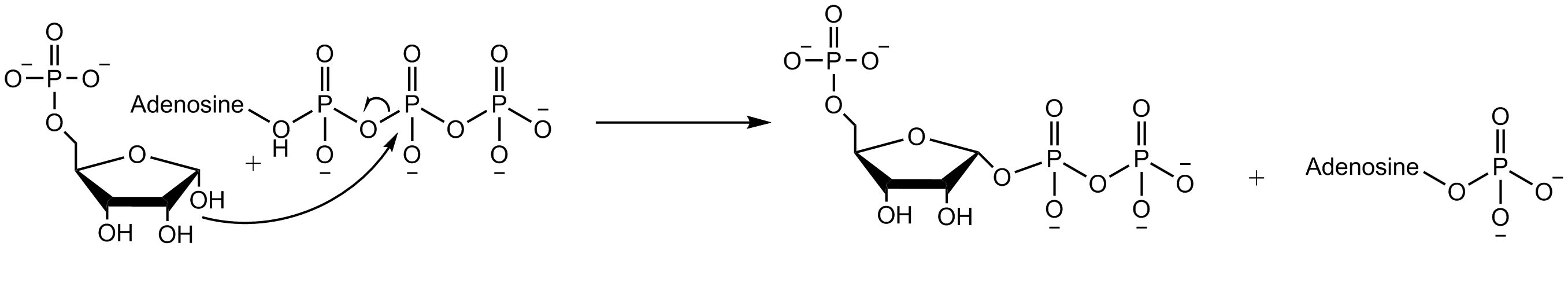
SN2 mechanism of phosphoribosyl pyrophosphate synthetase

== Structure ==
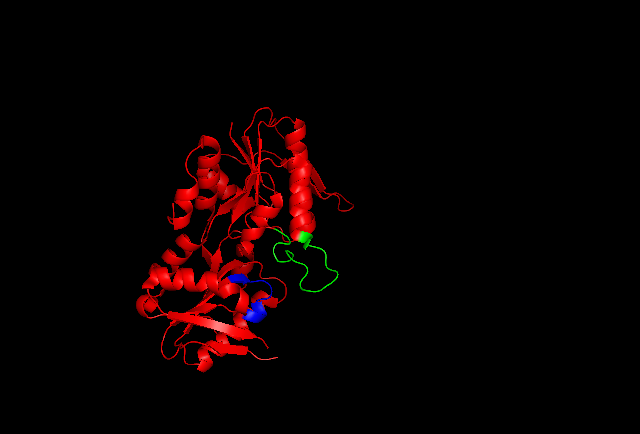
PyMol rendering of one subunit of the enzyme phosphoribosyl pyrophosphate synthetase I (human). Flexible loop colored in green; ribose 5-phosphate binding region colored in blue.

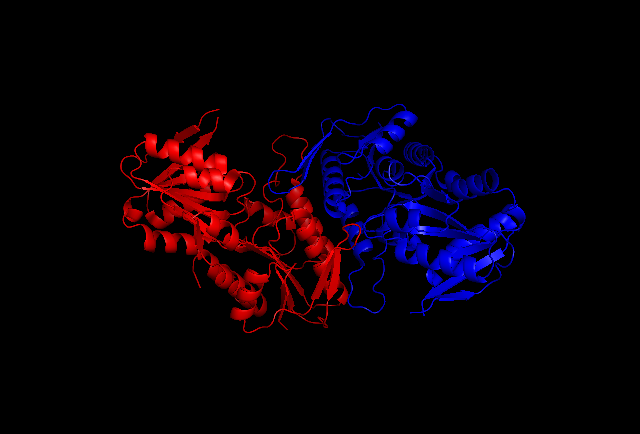
PyMol rendering of phosphoribosyl pyrophosphate synthetase I (human) as a homodimer, formed by two subunits (red and blue). Three homodimers form the active enzyme complex.

Crystallization and X-ray diffraction studies elucidated the structure of the enzyme, which was isolated by cloning, protein expression, and purification techniques. One subunit of ribose-phosphate diphosphokinase consists of 318 amino acids; the active enzyme complex consists of three homodimers (or six subunits, a hexamer). The structure of one subunit is a five-stranded parallel beta sheet (the central core) surrounded by four alpha helices at the N-terminal domain and five alpha helices at the C-terminal domain, with two short anti-parallel beta-sheets extending from the core. The catalytic site of the enzyme binds ATP and ribose 5-phosphate. The flexible loop (Phe92–Ser108), pyrophosphate binding loop (Asp171–Gly174), and flag region (Val30–Ile44 from an adjacent subunit) comprise the ATP binding site, located at the interface between two domains of one subunit. The flexible loop is so named because of its large variability in conformation. The ribose 5-phosphate binding site consists of residues Asp220–Thr228, located in the C-terminal domain of one subunit. The allosteric site, which binds ADP, consists of amino acid residues from three subunits.

== Function ==
The product of this reaction, phosphoribosyl pyrophosphate (PRPP), is used in numerous biosynthesis (de novo and salvage) pathways. PRPP provides the ribose sugar in de novo synthesis of purines and pyrimidines, used in the nucleotide bases that form RNA and DNA. PRPP reacts with orotate to form orotidylate, which can be converted to uridylate (UMP). UMP can then be converted to the nucleotide cytidine triphosphate (CTP). The reaction of PRPP, glutamine, and ammonia forms 5-Phosphoribosyl-1-amine, a precursor to inosinate (IMP), which can ultimately be converted to adenosine triphosphate (ATP) or guanosine triphosphate (GTP). PRPP plays a role in purine salvage pathways by reacting with free purine bases to form adenylate, guanylate, and inosinate. PRPP is also used in the synthesis of NAD: the reaction of PRPP with nicotinic acid yields the intermediate nicotinic acid mononucleotide.

== Regulation ==
Ribose-phosphate diphosphokinase requires Mg^{2+} for activity; the enzyme acts only on ATP coordinated with Mg^{2+}. Ribose-phosphate diphosphokinase is regulated by phosphorylation and allostery. It is activated by phosphate and inhibited by ADP; it is suggested that phosphate and ADP compete for the same regulatory site. At normal concentrations, phosphate activates the enzyme by binding to its allosteric regulatory site. However, at high concentrations, phosphate is shown to have an inhibitory effect by competing with the substrate ribose 5-phosphate for binding at the active site. ADP is the key allosteric inhibitor of ribose-phosphate diphosphokinase. It has been shown that at lower concentrations of the substrate ribose 5-phosphate, ADP may inhibit the enzyme competitively. Ribose-phosphate pyrophosphokinase is also inhibited by some of its downstream biosynthetic products.

== Role in disease ==
Because its product is a key compound in many biosynthetic pathways, ribose-phosphate diphosphokinase is involved in some rare disorders and X-linked recessive diseases. Mutations that lead to super-activity (increased enzyme activity or de-regulation of the enzyme) result in purine and uric acid overproduction. Super-activity symptoms include gout, sensorineural hearing loss, weak muscle tone (hypotonia), impaired muscle coordination (ataxia), hereditary peripheral neuropathy, and neurodevelopmental disorder. Mutations that lead to loss-of-function in ribose-phosphate diphosphokinase result in Charcot-Marie-Tooth disease and Arts syndrome.
