= Phosphate carrier protein, mitochondrial =

Mitochondrial transmembrane protein

SLC25A3

Identifiers
- Aliases: SLC25A3, PHC, PTP, OK/SW-cl.48, solute carrier family 25 member 3
- External IDs: OMIM: 600370; MGI: 1353498; GeneCards: SLC25A3

Gene location (Human)
Chr.	Chromosome 12 (human)
Band	12q23.1	Start	98,593,591 bp
Band	12q23.1	End	98,606,379 bp

Gene location (Mouse)
Chr.	Chromosome 10 (mouse)
Band	10|10 C2	Start	90,952,436 bp
Band	10|10 C2	End	90,959,921 bp
RNA expression pattern
Bgee	Human / Mouse (ortholog); Top expressed in: myocardium of left ventricle; apex of heart; cardiac muscle tissue of right atrium; right ventricle; tibialis anterior muscle; mucosa of ileum; right adrenal gland; right adrenal cortex; deltoid muscle; left adrenal gland / Top expressed in: muscle of thigh; right kidney; superior frontal gyrus; dentate gyrus of hippocampal formation granule cell; lip; neural layer of retina; esophagus; ventricular zone; embryo; embryo; More reference expression data
BioGPS	n/a
Gene ontology
Molecular function	protein-containing complex binding; symporter activity; inorganic phosphate transmembrane transporter activity; phosphate:proton symporter activity; transmembrane transporter activity
Cellular component	integral component of membrane; myelin sheath; integral component of plasma membrane; extracellular exosome; membrane; mitochondrion; mitochondrial inner membrane; integral component of mitochondrial inner membrane
Biological process	transmembrane transport; phosphate ion transmembrane transport; mitochondrial transport; transport; proton transmembrane transport
Sources:Amigo / QuickGO
Orthologs
Databases	NCBI: entry; OMA: entry
Species	Human	Mouse
Entrez	5250	18674
Ensembl	ENSG00000075415	ENSMUSG00000061904
UniProt	Q00325	Q8VEM8
RefSeq (mRNA)	NM_213612; NM_002635; NM_005888; NM_213611	NM_133668
RefSeq (protein)	NP_002626; NP_005879; NP_998776; NP_005879.1	NP_598429
Location (UCSC)	Chr 12: 98.59 – 98.61 Mb	Chr 10: 90.95 – 90.96 Mb
PubMed search
- Wikidata
View/Edit Human	View/Edit Mouse

Phosphate carrier protein, mitochondrial is a protein that in humans is encoded by the SLC25A3 gene. The encoded protein is a transmembrane protein located in the mitochondrial inner membrane and catalyzes the transport of phosphate ions across it for the purpose of oxidative phosphorylation. There are two significant isoforms of this gene expressed in human cells, which differ slightly in structure and function. Mutations in this gene can cause mitochondrial phosphate carrier deficiency (MPCD), a fatal disorder of oxidative phosphorylation symptomized by lactic acidosis, neonatal hypotonia, hypertrophic cardiomyopathy, and death within the first year of life.

== Structure ==
The SLC25A3 gene is located on the q arm of chromosome 12 in position 23.1 and spans 8,376 base pairs. The gene has 9 exons and produces a 40.1 kDa protein composed of 362 amino acids. The encoded protein (PHC) is a multi-pass transmembrane protein located in the mitochondrial inner membrane; it contains six transmembrane segments, emerging into a large extramembranous loop. Both the N-terminal and C-terminal regions of this protein protrude toward the cytosol. PHC contains three related segments arranged in tandem which are related to those found in other characterized members of the mitochondrial carrier family. There exist two transcript variants of this protein, PHC-A and PHC-B, which differ by 13 amino acids. Isoform A contains 42 amino acids while Isoform B contains 41. In vitro, the isoforms differ in their substrate affinities and transport rates.

== Function ==
The encoded protein (PHC) catalyzes the transport of phosphate from the cytosol into the mitochondrial matrix, either by proton cotransport or in exchange for hydroxyl ions. In the final steps of oxidative phosphorylation, this protein catalyzes the uptake of a phosphate ion with a proton across the mitochondrial inner membrane. The availability of inorganic phosphate for oxidative phosphorylation is mainly dependent on PHC activity. To substantially affect oxidative phosphorylation, PHC depletion must be severe, exceeding 85%. This protein may be involved in regulation of the mitochondrial permeability transition pore (mPTP).

== Clinical significance ==
Mutations in this gene can cause mitochondrial phosphate carrier deficiency (MPCD), a fatal disorder of oxidative phosphorylation. Symptoms include lactic acidosis, hypertrophic cardiomyopathy, and neonatal hypotonia; afflicted patients die within the first year of life.

Isoform A of this gene is expressed at high levels in heart, pancreatic, and skeletal muscle cells while Isoform B is expressed in all tissues, albeit poorly.

In the sole recorded case of a mutation in this gene, a homozygous mutation (c.215G>A) in the alternatively spliced exon 3A of this gene caused an amino acid replacement (G72E) in Isoform A. This leads to ATP synthase deficiency in muscle cells, which express Isoform A, but not in fibroblasts, which express Isoform B, causing MPCD and the aforementioned standard symptoms.

== Interactions ==
The encoded protein interacts with PPIF; this interaction is impaired by CsA.

== See also ==
- Solute carrier family
