= TIMM13 =

Protein-coding gene in the species Homo sapiens

Identifiers
- Aliases: TIMM13, TIM13, TIM13B, TIMM13A, TIMM13B, ppv1, translocase of inner mitochondrial membrane 13
- External IDs: OMIM: 607383; MGI: 1353432; HomoloGene: 40846; GeneCards: TIMM13; OMA:TIMM13 - orthologs

Gene location (Human)
Chr.	Chromosome 19 (human)
Band	19p13.3	Start	2,425,625 bp
Band	19p13.3	End	2,427,586 bp

Gene location (Mouse)
Chr.	Chromosome 10 (mouse)
Band	10 C1|10 39.72 cM	Start	80,735,284 bp
Band	10 C1|10 39.72 cM	End	80,736,803 bp
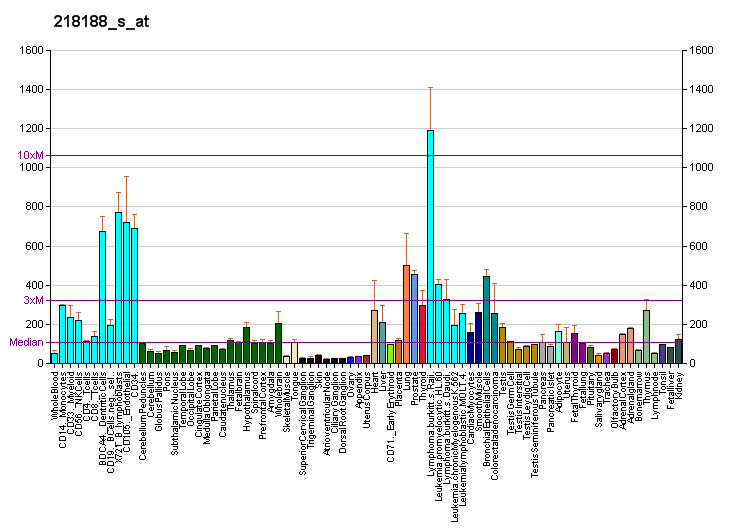
RNA expression pattern
Bgee	Human / Mouse (ortholog); Top expressed in: mucosa of transverse colon; apex of heart; right adrenal gland; right adrenal cortex; left adrenal gland; left adrenal cortex; right lobe of liver; prefrontal cortex; muscle of thigh; body of pancreas / Top expressed in: yolk sac; proximal tubule; right kidney; neural tube; white adipose tissue; quadriceps femoris muscle; adrenal gland; blastocyst; pancreas; mesencephalon; More reference expression data
BioGPS	More reference expression data
Gene ontology
Molecular function	zinc ion binding; metal ion binding
Cellular component	mitochondrial intermembrane space protein transporter complex; membrane; mitochondrion; fibrillar center; mitochondrial inner membrane; mitochondrial intermembrane space
Biological process	protein transport; protein targeting to mitochondrion; hearing; protein insertion into mitochondrial inner membrane
Sources:Amigo / QuickGO
Orthologs
Species	Human	Mouse
Entrez	26517	30055
Ensembl	ENSG00000099800	ENSMUSG00000020219
UniProt	Q9Y5L4	P62075
RefSeq (mRNA)	NM_012458	NM_013895
RefSeq (protein)	NP_036590	NP_038923
Location (UCSC)	Chr 19: 2.43 – 2.43 Mb	Chr 10: 80.74 – 80.74 Mb
PubMed search
- Wikidata
View/Edit Human	View/Edit Mouse

Mitochondrial import inner membrane translocase subunit Tim13 is an enzyme that in humans is encoded by the TIMM13 gene.

== Function ==
This gene encodes a translocase with similarity to yeast mitochondrial proteins that are involved in the import of metabolite transporters from the cytoplasm and into the mitochondrial inner membrane. The encoded protein and the TIMM8a protein form a 70 kDa complex in the intermembrane space. This gene is in a head-to-tail orientation with the gene for lamin B2.

== Interactions ==
TIMM13 has been shown to interact with TIMM8A.
