= Mitochondrial 2-oxoglutarate/malate carrier protein =

Mammalian protein found in Homo sapiens

SLC25A11

Identifiers
- Aliases: SLC25A11, OGC, SLC20A4, solute carrier family 25 member 11, PGL6
- External IDs: OMIM: 604165; MGI: 1915113; GeneCards: SLC25A11

Gene location (Human)
Chr.	Chromosome 17 (human)
Band	17p13.2	Start	4,937,130 bp
Band	17p13.2	End	4,940,053 bp

Gene location (Mouse)
Chr.	Chromosome 11 (mouse)
Band	11 B3|11 43.21 cM	Start	70,535,022 bp
Band	11 B3|11 43.21 cM	End	70,538,305 bp
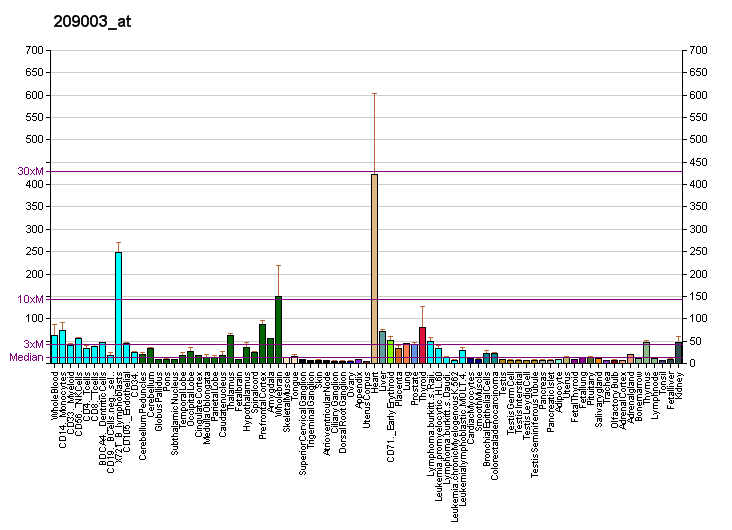

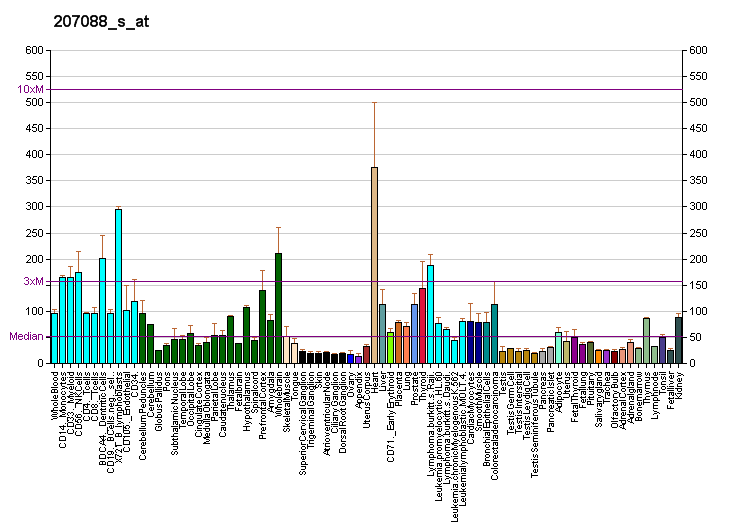
RNA expression pattern
Bgee	Human / Mouse (ortholog); Top expressed in: apex of heart; muscle of thigh; right auricle of heart; left ventricle; gastrocnemius muscle; body of tongue; mucosa of transverse colon; right frontal lobe; prefrontal cortex; Skeletal muscle tissue of rectus abdominis / Top expressed in: extraocular muscle; right ventricle; interventricular septum; digastric muscle; myocardium of ventricle; plantaris muscle; cardiac muscle tissue of left ventricle; temporal muscle; muscle of thigh; sternocleidomastoid muscle; More reference expression data
BioGPS	More reference expression data
Gene ontology
Molecular function	RNA binding; oxoglutarate:malate antiporter activity; transmembrane transporter activity
Cellular component	integral component of membrane; integral component of plasma membrane; membrane; mitochondrion; nucleus; mitochondrial inner membrane
Biological process	gluconeogenesis; alpha-ketoglutarate transport; mitochondrial transport; transport; transmembrane transport; malate transmembrane transport
Sources:Amigo / QuickGO
Orthologs
Databases	NCBI: entry; OMA: entry
Species	Human	Mouse
Entrez	8402	67863
Ensembl	ENSG00000108528	ENSMUSG00000014606
UniProt	Q02978	Q9CR62
RefSeq (mRNA)	NM_003562; NM_001165417; NM_001165418	NM_024211
RefSeq (protein)	NP_001158889; NP_001158890; NP_003553	NP_077173
Location (UCSC)	Chr 17: 4.94 – 4.94 Mb	Chr 11: 70.54 – 70.54 Mb
PubMed search
- Wikidata
View/Edit Human	View/Edit Mouse

Mitochondrial 2-oxoglutarate/malate carrier protein is a protein that in humans is encoded by the SLC25A11 gene. Inactivating mutations in this gene predispose to metastasic paraganglioma.

== See also ==
- Solute carrier family
