= Major facilitator superfamily =

Major Facilitator Superfamily
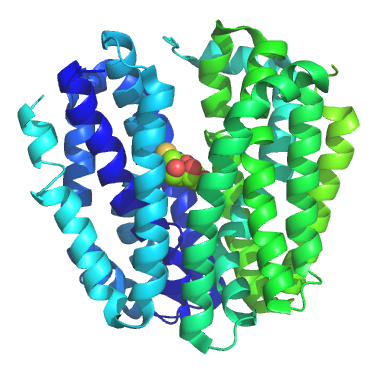
- Crystal Structure of Lactose Permease LacY.

Identifiers
- Symbol: MFS
- Pfam clan: CL0015
- ECOD: 5050.1.1
- TCDB: 2.A.1
- OPM superfamily: 15
- CDD: cd06174

The major facilitator superfamily (MFS) is a superfamily of membrane transport proteins that facilitate movement of small solutes across cell membranes in response to chemiosmotic gradients.

== Function ==
The major facilitator superfamily (MFS) are membrane proteins which are expressed ubiquitously in all kingdoms of life for the import or export of target substrates. The MFS family was originally believed to function primarily in the uptake of sugars but subsequent studies revealed that drugs, metabolites, oligosaccharides, amino acids and oxyanions were all transported by MFS family members. These proteins energetically drive transport utilizing the electrochemical gradient of the target substrate (uniporter), or act as a cotransporter where transport is coupled to the movement of a second substrate.

== Fold ==
The basic fold of the MFS transporter is built around 12, or in some cases, 14 transmembrane helices (TMH), with two 6- (or 7- ) helix bundles formed by the N and C terminal homologous domains of the transporter which are connected by an extended cytoplasmic loop. The two halves of the protein pack against each other in a clam-shell fashion, sealing via interactions at the ends of the transmembrane helices and extracellular loops. This forms a large aqueous cavity at the center of the membrane, which is alternatively open to the cytoplasm or periplasm/extracellular space. Lining this aqueous cavity are the amino-acids which bind the substrates and define transporter specificity. Many MFS transporters are thought to be dimers through in vitro and in vivo methods, with some evidence to suggest a functional role for this oligomerization.

== Mechanism ==
The alternating-access mechanism thought to underlie the transport of most MFS transport is classically described as the "rocker-switch" mechanism. In this model, the transporter opens to either the extracellular space or cytoplasm and simultaneously seals the opposing face of the transporter, preventing a continuous pathway across the membrane. For example, in the best studied MFS transporter, LacY, lactose and protons typically bind from the periplasm to specific sites within the aqueous cleft. This drives closure of the extracellular face, and opening of the cytoplasmic side, allowing substrate into the cell. Upon substrate release, the transporter recycles to the periplasmic facing orientation.

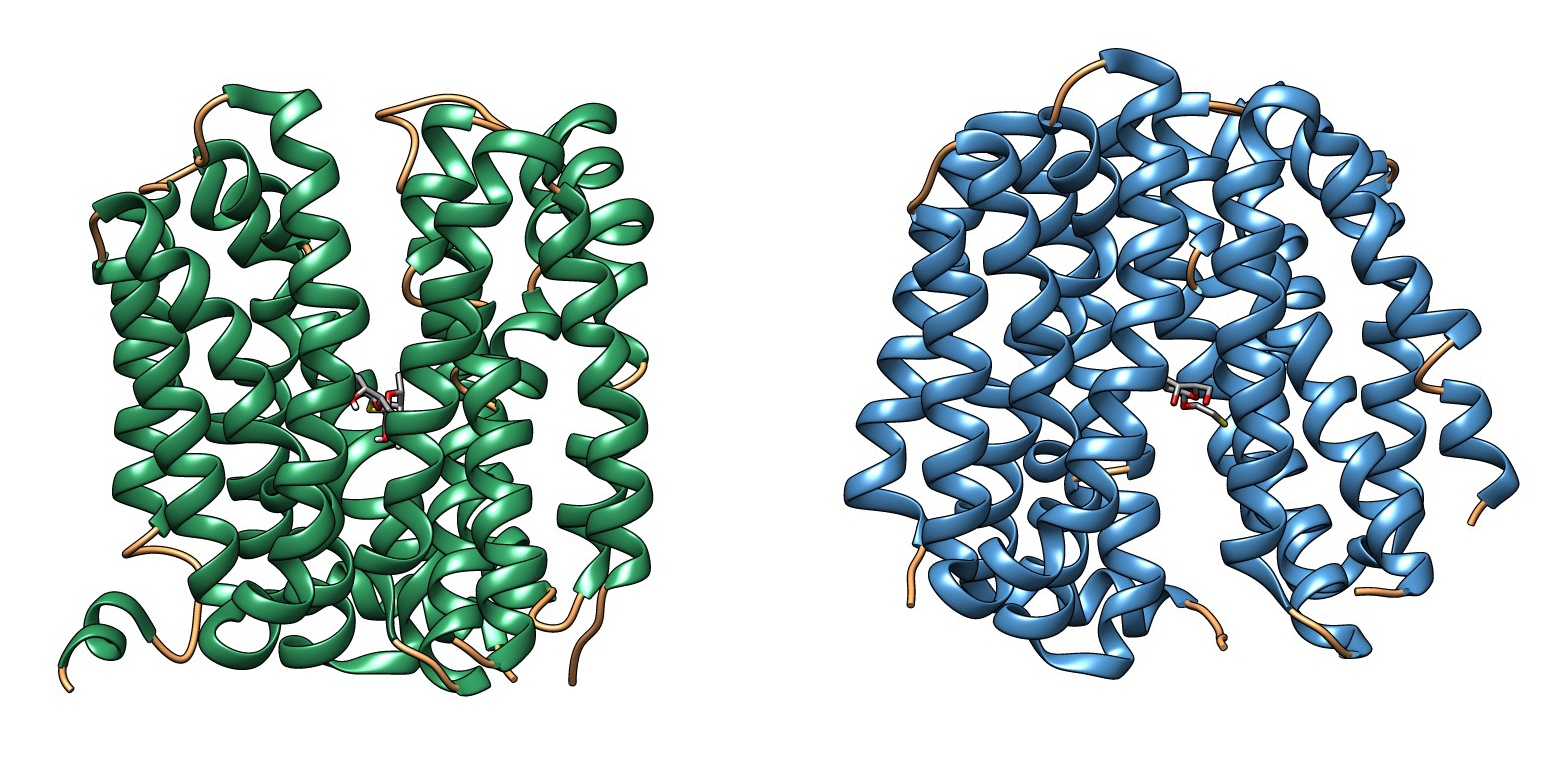
Structure of LacY open to the periplasm (left) or cytoplasm (right). Sugar analogs are shown bound in the cleft of both structures.

Exporters and antiporters of the MFS family follow a similar reaction cycle, though exporters bind substrate in the cytoplasm and extrude it to the extracellular or periplasmic space, while antiporters bind substrate in both states to drive each conformational change. While most MFS structures suggest large, rigid body structural changes with substrate binding, the movements may be small in the cases of small substrates, such as the nitrate transporter NarK.

=== Transport ===
The generalized transport reactions catalyzed by MFS porters are:

1. Uniport: S (out) ⇌ S (in)
2. Symport: S (out) + [H^{+} or Na^{+}] (out) ⇌ S (in) + [H^{+} or Na^{+}] (in)
3. Antiport: S_{1} (out) + S_{2} (in) ⇌ S_{1} (in) + S_{2} (out) (S_{1} may be H^{+} or a solute)

=== Substrate specificity ===
Though initially identified as sugar transporters, a function conserved from prokaryotes to mammals, the MFS family is notable for the great diversity of substrates transported by the superfamily. These range from small oxyanions to large peptide fragments. Other MFS transporters are notable for a lack of selectivity, extruding broad classes of drugs and xenobiotics. This substrate specificity is largely determined by specific side chains which line the aqueous pocket at the center of the membrane. While one substrate of particular biological importance is often used to name the transporter or family, there may also be co-transported or leaked ions or molecules. These include water molecules or the coupling ions which energetically drive transport.

== Structures ==
Crystal structure of GlpT in the inward facing state, with helical N and C domains colored purple and blue respectively. Loops colored green.

The crystal structures of a number of MFS transporters have been characterized. The first structures were of the glycerol 3-phosphate/phosphate exchanger GlpT and the lactose-proton symporter LacY, which served to elucidate the overall structure of the protein family and provided initial models for understanding the MFS transport mechanism. Since these initial structures other MFS structures have been solved which illustrate substrate specificity or states within the reaction cycle. While the initial MFS structures solved were of bacterial transporters, recently structures of the first eukaryotic structures have been published. These include a fungal phosphate transporter PiPT, plant nitrate transporter NRT1.1, and the human glucose transporter GLUT1.

== Evolution ==
The origin of the basic MFS transporter fold is currently under heavy debate. All currently recognized MFS permeases have the two six-TMH domains within a single polypeptide chain, although in some MFS families an additional two TMHs are present. Evidence suggests that the MFS permeases arose by a tandem intragenic duplication event in the early prokaryotes. This event generated the 12 transmembrane helix topology from a (presumed) primordial 6-helix dimer. Moreover, the well-conserved MFS specific motif between TMS2 and TMS3 and the related but less well conserved motif between TMS8 and TMS9 prove to be a characteristic of virtually all of the more than 300 MFS proteins identified. However, the origin of the primordial 6-helix domain is under heavy debate. While some functional and structural evidence suggests that this domain arose out of a simpler 3-helix domain, bioinformatic or phylogenetic evidence supporting this hypothesis is lacking.

== Medical significance ==
MFS family members are central to human physiology and play an important role in a number of diseases, through aberrant action, drug transport, or drug resistance. The OAT1 transporter transports a number of nucleoside analogs central to antiviral therapy. Resistance to antibiotics is frequently the result of action of MFS resistance genes. Mutations in MFS transporters have also been found to cause neurodegerative disease, vascular disorders of the brain, and glucose storage diseases.

=== Disease mutations ===
Disease associated mutations have been found in a number of human MFS transporters; those annotated in Uniprot are listed below.

| Name | Uniprot ID | Function | Disease |
|---|---|---|---|
| SLC37A4 | O43826 | Transports glucose-6-phosphate from the cytoplasm to the lumen of the endoplasmic reticulum. Forms with glucose-6-phosphatase the complex responsible for glucose production through glycogenolysis and gluconeogenesis. Hence, it plays a central role in homeostatic regulation of blood glucose levels. | Glycogen storage disease type I |
| FLVCR1 | Q9Y5Y0 | Heme transporter that exports cytoplasmic heme. It can also export coproporphyrin and protoporphyrin IX, which are both intermediate products in the heme biosynthetic pathway. Does not export bilirubin. Heme export depends on the presence of HPX and may be required to protect developing erythroid cells from heme toxicity. Heme export also provides protection from heme or ferrous iron toxicities in liver and brain. Causes susceptibility to FeLV-C in vitro. Required during erythtopoiesis to maintain intracellular free heme balance since in proerythroblasts, heme synthesis intensifies and its accumulation is toxic for cells. | Retinitis pigmentosa |
| SLC33A1 | O00400 | Probable acetyl-CoA transporter necessary for O-acetylation of gangliosides. | Spastic paraplegia |
| SLC17A5 | Q9NRA2 | Transports glucuronic acid and free sialic acid out of the lysosome after it is cleaved from sialoglycoconjugates undergoing degradation, this is required for normal CNS myelination. Mediates aspartate and glutamate membrane potential-dependent uptake into synaptic vesicles and synaptic-like microvesicles. Also functions as an electrogenic 2NO(3)(-)/H(+) cotransporter in the plasma membrane of salivary gland acinar cells, mediating the physiological nitrate efflux, 25% of the circulating nitrate ions is typically removed and secreted in saliva. | Salla disease |
| SLC2A10 | O95528 | Facilitative glucose transporter. | Arterial tortuosity syndrome |
| SLC22A12 | Q96S37 | Required for efficient urate re-absorption in the kidney. Regulates blood urate levels. Mediates saturable urate uptake by facilitating the exchange of urate against organic anions. | Hypouricemia |
| SLC16A1 | P53985 | Proton-coupled monocarboxylate transporter. Catalyzes the rapid transport across the plasma membrane of many monocarboxylates such as lactate, pyruvate, branched-chain oxo acids derived from leucine, valine and isoleucine, and the ketone bodies acetoacetate, beta-hydroxybutyrate and acetate. Depending on the tissue and on circumstances, mediates the import or export of lactic acid and ketone bodies. Required for normal nutrient assimilation, increase of white adipose tissue and body weight gain when on a high-fat diet. Plays a role in cellular responses to a high-fat diet by modulating the cellular levels of lactate and pyruvate, small molecules that contribute to the regulation of central metabolic pathways and insulin secretion, with concomitant effects on plasma insulin levels and blood glucose homeostasis. | Hypoglycemia |
| SLC22A5 | O76082 | Sodium-ion dependent, high affinity carnitine transporter. Involved in the active cellular uptake of carnitine. Transports one sodium ion with one molecule of carnitine. Also transports organic cations such as tetraethylammonium (TEA) without the involvement of sodium. | Systemic primary carnitine deficiency |
| CLN3 | Q13286 | Involved in microtubule-dependent, anterograde transport of late endosomes and lysosomes. | Ceroid lipofuscinosis |
| SLC16A13 | Q7RTY0 | Proton-linked monocarboxylate transporter. Catalyzes the rapid transport across the plasma membrane of many monocarboxylates (By similarity). | Diabetes mellitus |
| SLC2A9 | Q9NRM0 | Transport urate and fructose. May have a role in the urate reabsorption by proximal tubules. Also transports glucose at low rate. | Hypouricemia |
| SLC19A3 | Q9BZV2 | Mediates high affinity thiamine uptake, probably via a proton anti-port mechanism. | Thiamine metabolism dysfunction syndrome |
| FLVCR2 | Q9UPI3 | Acts as an importer of heme. Also acts as a transporter for a calcium-chelator complex, important for growth and calcium metabolism. | Fowler syndrome |
| SLC16A12 | Q6ZSM3 | Proton-linked monocarboxylate transporter. Catalyzes the rapid transport across the plasma membrane of many monocarboxylates (By similarity). | Cataract |
| SLC19A2 | O60779 | High-affinity transporter for the intake of thiamine. | Megaloblastic Anemia |
| MFSD8 | Q8NHS3 | May be a carrier that transport small solutes by using chemiosmotic ion gradients (Potential). | Ceroid lipofuscinosis |
| SLC40A1 | Q9NP59 | May be involved in iron export from duodenal epithelial cell and also in transfer of iron between maternal and fetal circulation. Mediates iron efflux in the presence of a ferroxidase (hephaestin and/or ceruloplasmin). | Hemochromatosis |
| SLC2A4 | P14672 | Insulin-regulated facilitative glucose transporter. | Diabetes mellitus |
| SLC45A2 | Q9UMX9 | Melanocyte differentiation antigen. May transport substances required for melanin biosynthesis (By similarity). | Albinism |
| SLCO2A1 | Q92959 | May mediate the release of newly synthesized prostaglandins from cells, the transepithelial transport of prostaglandins, and the clearance of prostaglandins from the circulation. Transports PGD2, as well as PGE1, PGE2 and PGF2A. | Hypertrophic osteoarthropathy |
| SLC22A4 | Q9H015 | Sodium-ion dependent, low affinity carnitine transporter. Probably transports one sodium ion with one molecule of carnitine. Also transports organic cations such as tetraethylammonium (TEA) without the involvement of sodium. Relative uptake activity ratio of carnitine to TEA is 1.78. A key substrate of this transporter seems to be ergothioneine (ET). | Rheumatoid arthritis |
| SLC16A11 | Q8NCK7 | Proton-linked monocarboxylate transporter. Catalyzes the rapid transport across the plasma membrane of many monocarboxylates (By similarity). Probably involved in hepatic lipid metabolism: overexpression results in an increase of triacylglycerol(TAG) levels, small increases in intracellular diacylglycerols and decreases in lysophosphatidylcholine, cholesterol ester and sphingomyelin lipids. | Diabetes mellitus |
| SLCO1B3 | Q9NPD5 | Mediates the Na(+)-independent uptake of organic anions such as 17-beta-glucuronosyl estradiol, taurocholate, triiodothyronine (T3), leukotriene C4, dehydroepiandrosterone sulfate (DHEAS), methotrexate and sulfobromophthalein (BSP). Involved in the clearance of bile acids and organic anions from the liver. | Hyperbilirubinemia |
| SLCO1B1 | Q9Y6L6 | Mediates the Na(+)-independent uptake of organic anions such as pravastatin, taurocholate, methotrexate, dehydroepiandrosterone sulfate, 17-beta-glucuronosyl estradiol, estrone sulfate, prostaglandin E2, thromboxane B2, leukotriene C3, leukotriene E4, thyroxine and triiodothyronine. Involved in the clearance of bile acids and organic anions from the liver. | Hyperbilirubinemia |
| SLC2A2 | P11168 | Facilitative glucose transporter. This isoform likely mediates the bidirectional transfer of glucose across the plasma membrane of hepatocytes and is responsible for uptake of glucose by the beta cells; may comprise part of the glucose-sensing mechanism of the beta cell. May also participate with the Na(+)/glucose cotransporter in the transcellular transport of glucose in the small intestine and kidney. | Fanconi-Bickel syndrome |
| SLC2A1 | P11166 | Facilitative glucose transporter. This isoform may be responsible for constitutive or basal glucose uptake. Has a very broad substrate specificity; can transport a wide range of aldoses including both pentoses and hexoses. | GLUT1 deficiency syndrome 1 |
| SLC46A1 | Q96NT5 | Has been shown to act both as an intestinal proton-coupled high-affinity folate transporter and as an intestinal heme transporter which mediates heme uptake from the gut lumen into duodenal epithelial cells. The iron is then released from heme and may be transported into the bloodstream. Dietary heme iron is an important nutritional source of iron. Shows a higher affinity for folate than heme. | Hereditary folate malabsorption |
| SLC17A8 | Q8NDX2 | Mediates the uptake of glutamate into synaptic vesicles at presynaptic nerve terminals of excitatory neural cells. May also mediate the transport of inorganic phosphate. | Deafness |

== Human MFS proteins ==
There are several MFS proteins in humans, where they are known as solute carriers (SLCs) and Atypical SLCs. There are today 52 SLC families, of which 16 families include MFS proteins; SLC2, 15 16, 17, 18, 19, SLCO (SLC21), 22, 29, 33, 37, 40, 43, 45, 46 and 49. Atypical SLCs are MFS proteins, sharing sequence similarities and evolutionary origin with SLCs, but they are not named according to the SLC root system, which originates from the hugo gene nomenclature system (HGNC). All atypical SLCs are listed in detail in, but they are: MFSD1, MFSD2A, MFSD2B, MFSD3, MFSD4A, MFSD4B, MFSD5, MFSD6, MFSD6L, MFSD8, MFSD9, MFSD10, MFSD11, MFSD12, MFSD13A, MFSD14A, MFSD14B, UNC93A, UNC93B1, SV2A, SV2B, SV2C, SVOP, SVOPL, SPNS1, SPNS2, SPNS3 and CLN3. As there is high sequence identity and phylogenetic resemblance between the atypical SLCs of MFS type, they can be divided into 15 AMTFs (Atypical MFS Transporter Families), suggesting there are at least 64 different families including SLC proteins of MFS type.
