= Atypical SLCs =

Atypical Solute Carrier Families (Atypical SLCs) are novel plausible secondary active or facilitative transporter proteins that share ancestral background with the known solute carrier families (SLCs). However, they have not been assigned a name according to the SLC root system, or been classified into any of the existing SLC families.

== Atypical major facilitator superfamily transport families ==
Most atypical SLCs are families within the major facilitator superfamily (MFS). These atypical SLCs are plausible secondary active or facilitative transporter proteins that share ancestry with the known solute carriers. They are, however, not named according to the SLC root system, or classified into any of the existing SLC families. Atypical MFS transporter families (ATMFs) are categorised based on their sequence similarity and phylogenetic closeness.

AMTF	Family members	SLC family
AMTF1	MFSD9, MFSD10, MFSD14A, MFSD14B	SLC46
AMTF2	MFSD8	
AMTF3	MFSD4A, MFSD4B	
AMTF4	CLN3	
AMTF5	MFSD7	SLC49
AMTF6	MFSD1, MFSD5	
AMTF7	MFSD12	
AMTF8	MFSD2A, MFSD2B	
AMTF9	SV2A, SV2B, SV2C, SVOP, SVOPL	SLC22
AMTF10	MFSD11, UNC93A, UNC93B1	
AMTF11	SPNS1, SPNS2, SPNS3	
AMTF12	MFSD13A	
AMTF13	MFSD6	
AMTF14	MFSD6L	
AMTF15	MFSD3	

Some Atypical SLC of MFS type are: OCA2, CLN3, SPNS1, SPNS2, SPNS3, SV2A, SV2B, SV2C, SVOP, SVOPL, MFSD1, MFSD2A, MFSD2B, MFSD3, MFSD4A, MFSD4B, MFSD5, MFSD6, MFSD6L, MFSD8, MFSD9, MFSD10, MFSD11, MFSD12, MFSD13A, MFSD14A, MFSD14B, UNC93A and UNC93B1. All these are atypical SLCs found within the Major facilitator superfamily. Also TMEM104 (APC clan), OCA2 (IT clan) and CLN3 (having no clan) are atypical SLCs in humans.

== Non-MFS transport families ==
Although most atypical SLCs are from the major facilitator superfamily, there are exceptions: TMEM104 (APC superfamily), OCA2 (IT superfamily) and CLN3 (unknown superfamily).
