= UNC93A =

Protein-coding gene in the species Homo sapiens

Identifiers
- Aliases: UNC93A, Unc-93A, dJ366N23.1, dJ366N23.2, UNC93A (gene), unc-93 homolog A (C. elegans), unc-93 homolog A
- External IDs: OMIM: 607995; MGI: 1933250; GeneCards: UNC93A

Gene location (Human)
Chr.	Chromosome 6 (human)
Band	6q27	Start	167,271,169 bp
Band	6q27	End	167,316,014 bp

Gene location (Mouse)
Chr.	Chromosome 17 (mouse)
Band	17 A1|17 8.78 cM	Start	13,327,504 bp
Band	17 A1|17 8.78 cM	End	13,350,697 bp
RNA expression pattern
Bgee	Human / Mouse (ortholog); Top expressed in: skin of leg; secondary oocyte; skin of abdomen; right lobe of liver; buccal mucosa cell; duodenum; rectum; gallbladder; human kidney; metanephros / Top expressed in: jejunum; spermatid; esophagus; duodenum; placenta; white adipose tissue; colon; ileum; blastocyst; testicle; More reference expression data
BioGPS	n/a
Gene ontology
Molecular function	molecular function
Cellular component	membrane; integral component of membrane; plasma membrane
Biological process	biological process
Sources:Amigo / QuickGO
Orthologs
Databases	NCBI: entry; OMA: entry
Species	Human	Mouse
Entrez	54346	381058
Ensembl	ENSG00000112494	ENSMUSG00000067049
UniProt	Q86WB7	Q710D3
RefSeq (mRNA)	NM_001143947; NM_018974	NM_199252
RefSeq (protein)	NP_001137419; NP_061847	NP_954860
Location (UCSC)	Chr 6: 167.27 – 167.32 Mb	Chr 17: 13.33 – 13.35 Mb
PubMed search
- Wikidata
View/Edit Human	View/Edit Mouse

Unc-93 homolog A (C. elegans) is a protein that in humans is encoded by the UNC93A gene.

Unc93A is a putative solute carrier within the major facilitator superfamily (MFS). It belongs to the atypical SLCs that was recently listed. It is therefore presumed that UNC93A is a transporter protein.

It is expressed in neurons, with staining close to the plasma membrane.[8]

UNC93A is closely related to UNC93B1 and MFSD11.

UNC93A is affected by amino acid deprivation in cell cortex cultures and starvation in in vivo samples.

Read also for functional studies in C.elegans.

For you who are interested to read more about Unc93A in different species, see:
