= Heme transporter =

Protein that delivers heme to parts of a cell

A heme transporter is a protein that delivers heme to the various parts of a biological cell that require it.

Heme is a major source of dietary iron in humans and other mammals, and its synthesis in the body is well understood, but its catabolic and transport pathways are not as well understood. It is likely that heme is tightly regulated for two reasons: the toxic nature of iron in cells, and the lack of a regulated excretory system for excess iron. Understanding heme pathways is therefore important in understanding diseases such as hemochromatosis and anemia.

== Heme transport ==
Members of the SLC48 and SLC49 solute carrier family participate in heme transport across cellular membranes (heme-transporting ATPase).

SLC48A1—also known as Heme-Responsive Gene 1 (HRG1)—and its orthologues were first identified as a heme transporter family through a genetic screen in C.elegans. The protein plays a role in mobilizing heme from the lysosome to the cytoplasm. Deletion of the gene in mice leads to accumulation of heme crystals called hemozoin within the lysosomes of bone marrow, liver and splenic macrophages, but the gene is not known to be associated with human disease.

FLVCR1 was originally identified as the receptor for the feline leukemia virus, whose genetic disruption leads to anemia and disruption of heme transport. It appears to protect cells at the CFU-E stage by exporting heme to prevent heme toxicity. Rare homozygous mutations result in autosomal recessive posterior column ataxia with retinitis pigmentosa.

FLVCR2 is closely related to FLCVR1, and genetic transfection experiments indicate that it transports heme. Mutations in the gene are associated with proliferative vasculopathy and hydranencephaly-hydrocephaly syndrome (PVHH, also known as Fowler syndrome).

Related genes SLC49A3 and SLC49A4 are less well characterized functionally, although SLC49A4 is also known as Disrupted In Renal Cancer Protein 2 or RCC4 due to an association with renal cell cancer.
