= SLC75A1 =

Protein encoding gene in humans

Identifiers
- Aliases: SLC75A1, TETRAN, TETTRAN, major facilitator superfamily domain containing 10, MFSD10
- External IDs: OMIM: 610977; MGI: 1915544; GeneCards: SLC75A1

Gene location (Human)
Chr.	Chromosome 4 (human)
Band	4p16.3	Start	2,930,561 bp
Band	4p16.3	End	2,934,834 bp

Gene location (Mouse)
Chr.	Chromosome 5 (mouse)
Band	5|5 B2	Start	34,790,986 bp
Band	5|5 B2	End	34,794,556 bp
RNA expression pattern
Bgee	Human / Mouse (ortholog); Top expressed in: right uterine tube; oocyte; right hemisphere of cerebellum; granulocyte; canal of the cervix; right lobe of thyroid gland; right ovary; left ovary; left lobe of thyroid gland; anterior pituitary / Top expressed in: embryo; yolk sac; embryo; epiblast; lip; superior frontal gyrus; ventricular zone; granulocyte; internal carotid artery; external carotid artery; More reference expression data
BioGPS	n/a
Gene ontology
Molecular function	tetracycline transmembrane transporter activity; organic anion transmembrane transporter activity
Cellular component	brush border membrane; membrane; cytoplasmic vesicle membrane; integral component of membrane
Biological process	transmembrane transport; sodium-independent organic anion transport; apoptotic process; tetracycline transmembrane transport
Sources:Amigo / QuickGO
Orthologs
Databases	NCBI: entry; OMA: entry
Species	Human	Mouse
Entrez	10227	68294
Ensembl	ENSG00000109736	ENSMUSG00000001082
UniProt	Q14728	Q9D2V8
RefSeq (mRNA)	NM_001120; NM_001146069; NM_001363679	NM_026660; NM_001356978; NM_001356979
RefSeq (protein)	NP_001111; NP_001139541; NP_001350608	NP_080936; NP_001343907; NP_001343908
Location (UCSC)	Chr 4: 2.93 – 2.93 Mb	Chr 5: 34.79 – 34.79 Mb
PubMed search
- Wikidata
View/Edit Human	View/Edit Mouse

SLC75A1 is a protein that in humans is encoded by the SLC75A1 gene. SLC48A1 encodes a protein in the major facilitator superfamily, which acts as a solute carrier for the efflux of organic anions.
