= C18H20FN3O4 =

The molecular formula C_{18}H_{20}FN_{3}O_{4} (molar mass: 361.368 g/mol, exact mass: 361.1438 u) may refer to:

- Levofloxacin
- Ofloxacin
- Zimlovisertib
