= Synaptic vesicle glycoprotein =

Synaptic vesicle glycoprotein (SV) may refer to:

- Synaptic vesicle glycoprotein 2A (SV2A)
- Synaptic vesicle glycoprotein 2B (SV2B)
- Synaptic vesicle glycoprotein 2C (SV2C)
