= SLC49A4 =

Protein-coding gene in humans

Identifiers
- Aliases: SLC49A4, RCC4, disrupted in renal carcinoma 2, solute carrier family 49 member 4, DIRC2
- External IDs: OMIM: 602773; MGI: 2387188; GeneCards: SLC49A4

Gene location (Human)
Chr.	Chromosome 3 (human)
Band	3q21.1	Start	122,795,069 bp
Band	3q21.1	End	122,881,139 bp

Gene location (Mouse)
Chr.	Chromosome 16 (mouse)
Band	16|16 B3	Start	35,514,432 bp
Band	16|16 B3	End	35,589,726 bp
RNA expression pattern
Bgee	Human / Mouse (ortholog); Top expressed in: secondary oocyte; skin of arm; placenta; decidua; tibialis anterior muscle; cardiac muscle tissue of right atrium; deltoid muscle; pancreatic epithelial cell; myocardium of left ventricle; gingival epithelium / Top expressed in: muscle of thigh; sternocleidomastoid muscle; triceps brachii muscle; gastrocnemius muscle; interventricular septum; quadriceps femoris muscle; temporal muscle; knee joint; vastus lateralis muscle; skeletal muscle tissue; More reference expression data
BioGPS	n/a
Orthologs
Databases	NCBI: entry; OMA: entry
Species	Human	Mouse
Entrez	84925	224132
Ensembl	ENSG00000138463	ENSMUSG00000022848
UniProt	Q96SL1	Q8BFQ6
RefSeq (mRNA)	NM_032839	NM_153550
RefSeq (protein)	NP_116228	NP_705778
Location (UCSC)	Chr 3: 122.8 – 122.88 Mb	Chr 16: 35.51 – 35.59 Mb
PubMed search
- Wikidata
View/Edit Human	View/Edit Mouse

Solute carrier family 49 member 4 (also called DIRC2) is a protein that in humans is encoded by the SLC49A4 gene.

== Function ==
This gene encodes a membrane-bound protein from the major facilitator superfamily of transporters. Disruption of this gene by translocation has been associated with haplo-insufficiency and renal cell carcinomas.
