= MFSD8 =

Protein-coding gene in the species Homo sapiens

Identifiers
- Aliases: MFSD8, CLN7, CCMD, major facilitator superfamily domain containing 8
- External IDs: OMIM: 611124; MGI: 1919425; GeneCards: MFSD8

Gene location (Human)
Chr.	Chromosome 4 (human)
Band	4q28.2	Start	127,917,799 bp
Band	4q28.2	End	127,966,034 bp

Gene location (Mouse)
Chr.	Chromosome 3 (mouse)
Band	3|3 B	Start	40,818,103 bp
Band	3|3 B	End	40,846,886 bp
RNA expression pattern
Bgee	Human / Mouse (ortholog); Top expressed in: Achilles tendon; body of pancreas; bone marrow cell; epithelium of colon; cerebellar hemisphere; sural nerve; pancreatic epithelial cell; monocyte; right hemisphere of cerebellum; anterior pituitary / Top expressed in: white adipose tissue; quadriceps femoris muscle; muscle tissue; skeletal muscle tissue; liver; muscle of thigh; ganglionic eminence; jejunum; neural layer of retina; ileum; More reference expression data
BioGPS	n/a
Orthologs
Databases	NCBI: entry; OMA: entry
Species	Human	Mouse
Entrez	256471	72175
Ensembl	ENSG00000164073	ENSMUSG00000025759
UniProt	Q8NHS3	Q8BH31
RefSeq (mRNA)	NM_152778; NM_001363520; NM_001363521; NM_001371590; NM_001371591 NM_001371592; NM_001371593; NM_001371594; NM_001371595; NM_001371596	NM_028140
RefSeq (protein)	NP_689991; NP_001350449; NP_001350450; NP_001358519; NP_001358520 NP_001358521; NP_001358522; NP_001358523; NP_001358524; NP_001358525	NP_082416
Location (UCSC)	Chr 4: 127.92 – 127.97 Mb	Chr 3: 40.82 – 40.85 Mb
PubMed search
- Wikidata
View/Edit Human	View/Edit Mouse

Major facilitator superfamily domain containing 8 also called MFSD8 is a protein that in humans is encoded by the MFSD8 gene. MFSD8 is an atypical SLC, thus a predicted SLC transporter. It clusters phylogenetically to the Atypical MFS Transporter family 2 (AMTF2).

== Function ==
MFSD8 is a ubiquitous integral membrane protein which contains a transporter domain and a major facilitator superfamily (MFS) domain. Other members of the major facilitator superfamily transport small solutes through chemiosmotic ion gradients. The substrate transported by this protein is unknown. The protein, likely localizes to lysosomal membranes.

== Clinical significance ==
Mutations in the MFSD8 gene have been of neuronal ceroid lipofuscinosis.
