= MFSD2 =

Protein found in humans

MFSD2A

Identifiers
- Aliases: MFSD2A, MFSD2, NLS1, MCPH15, major facilitator superfamily domain containing 2A, NEDMISBA, SLC59A1
- External IDs: OMIM: 614397; MGI: 1923824; GeneCards: MFSD2A

Gene location (Human)
Chr.	Chromosome 1 (human)
Band	1p34.2	Start	39,955,112 bp
Band	1p34.2	End	39,969,968 bp

Gene location (Mouse)
Chr.	Chromosome 4 (mouse)
Band	4|4 D2.2	Start	122,840,643 bp
Band	4|4 D2.2	End	122,854,981 bp
RNA expression pattern
Bgee	Human / Mouse (ortholog); Top expressed in: right lobe of liver; skin of abdomen; mucosa of ileum; skin of leg; seminal vesicula; skin of arm; corpus epididymis; right testis; left testis; upper lobe of left lung / Top expressed in: primary oocyte; zygote; otolith organ; utricle; right kidney; epithelium of lens; sciatic nerve; superior frontal gyrus; secondary oocyte; visual cortex; More reference expression data
BioGPS	n/a
Gene ontology
Molecular function	symporter activity; phospholipid transporter activity; fatty acid transmembrane transporter activity; lysophospholipid:sodium symporter activity; transporter activity
Cellular component	integral component of membrane; integral component of plasma membrane; endoplasmic reticulum membrane; endoplasmic reticulum; membrane; plasma membrane
Biological process	lipid transport; fatty acid transport; transcytosis; lipid transport across blood-brain barrier; transmembrane transport; establishment of blood-brain barrier; phosphatidylcholine biosynthetic process; hippocampus development; lysophospholipid transport; carbohydrate transport; organic substance transport
Sources:Amigo / QuickGO
Orthologs
Databases	NCBI: entry; OMA: entry
Species	Human	Mouse
Entrez	84879	76574
Ensembl	ENSG00000168389	ENSMUSG00000028655
UniProt	Q8NA29; Q5SSK0	Q9DA75
RefSeq (mRNA)	NM_001136493; NM_001287808; NM_001287809; NM_032793; NM_001349821 NM_001349822; NM_001349823	NM_029662
RefSeq (protein)	NP_001129965; NP_001274737; NP_001274738; NP_116182; NP_001336750 NP_001336751; NP_001336752	NP_083938
Location (UCSC)	Chr 1: 39.96 – 39.97 Mb	Chr 4: 122.84 – 122.85 Mb
PubMed search
- Wikidata
View/Edit Human	View/Edit Mouse

Major facilitator superfamily domain-containing protein 2 (MFSD2 or MFSD2A), also known as sodium-dependent lysophosphatidylcholine symporter 1, is a protein that in humans is encoded by the MFSD2A gene. MFSD2A is a membrane transport protein that is expressed in the endothelium of the blood–brain barrier (BBB) and has an essential role in BBB formation and function. Genetic ablation of MFSD2A results in leaky BBB and increases central nervous system endothelial cell vesicular transcytosis without otherwise affecting tight junctions. MFSD2A is an atypical SLC, thus a predicted SLC transporter. It clusters phylogenetically to AMTF8.

In addition to transport of other lysophosphatidylcholines across the BBB, MSFD2A is the primary mechanism for docosahexaenoic acid (DHA, an omega-3 fatty acid) uptake and transport into the brain. It may also be responsible for uptake and transport of tunicamycin.

Complete loss of MFSD2A in human leads to a recessive lethal microcephaly syndrome consisting of enlarged lateral ventricles and underdevelopment of the cerebellum and brainstem. This is presumably due to loss of uptake of essential polyunsaturated fatty acids by the brain endothelial cells, which utilize MFSD2A as a transporter for these fats. Serum from patients showed elevated levels of essential polyunsaturated fatty acids, presumably due to the inability of vascular cells to uptake these lipids in the absence of protein function. Without the ability to uptake these fats into endothelial cells, there is breakdown of the blood-brain-barrier and loss of brain volume. This was demonstrated in a zebrafish model by intracardiac injection of dye, which was found to extravasate into the brain parenchyma following inactivating one of the paralogues of MSFD2A known as mfsd2aa.
