= Zabedosertib =

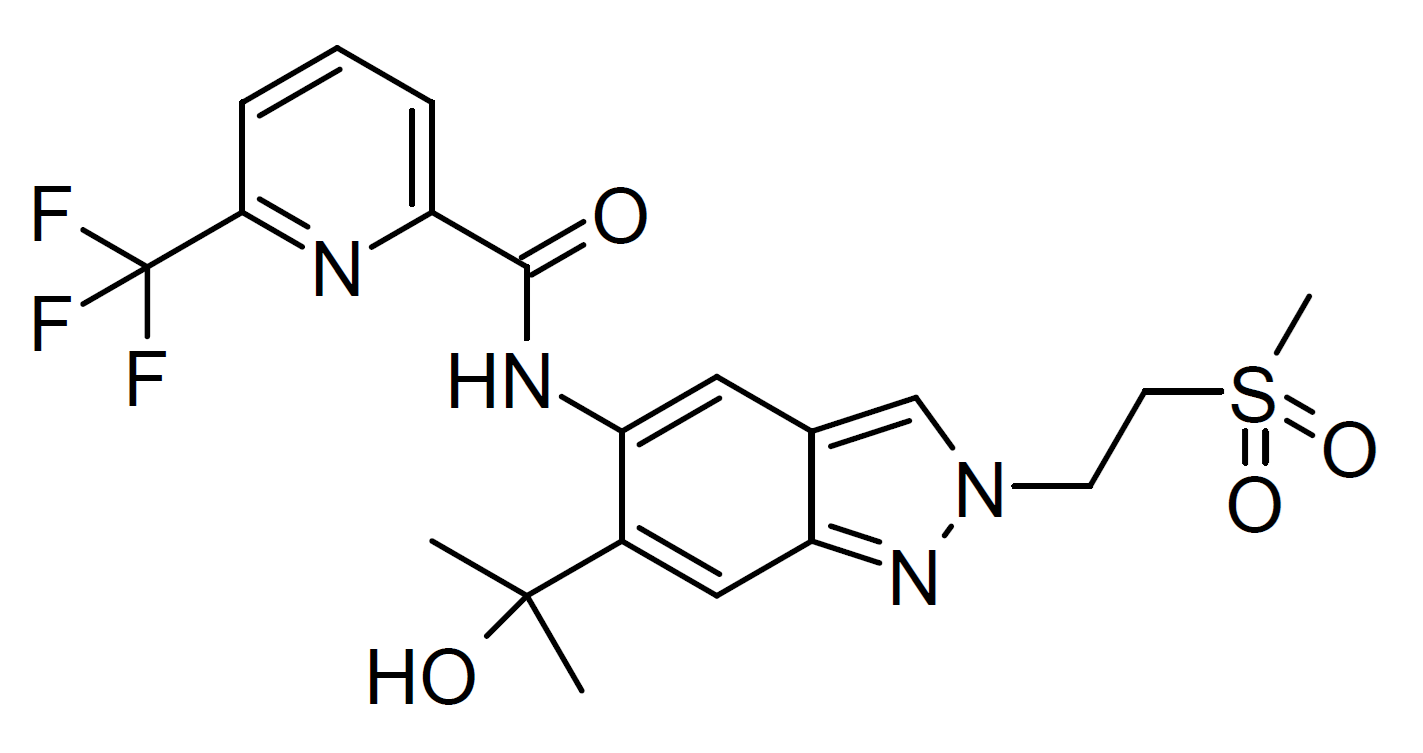

Identifiers
- IUPAC name: N-[6-(2-hydroxypropan-2-yl)-2-(2-methylsulfonylethyl)indazol-5-yl]-6-(trifluoromethyl)pyridine-2-carboxamide
- CAS Number: 1931994-81-8
- PubChem CID: 121364961
- IUPHAR/BPS: 11415
- DrugBank: DB18767
- ChemSpider: 101935510
- UNII: N1GRK350ZM
- KEGG: D96922
- ChEMBL: ChEMBL5429345

Chemical and physical data
- Formula: C_{21}H_{22}F_{3}N_{3}O_{4}S
- Molar mass: 469.48 g·mol^{−1}
- 3D model (JSmol): Interactive image
- SMILES: O=S(=O)(C)CCn1nc2cc(c(NC(=O)c3cc(ccc3)C(F)(F)F)cc2c1)C(O)(C)C
- InChI: InChI=1S/C20H21F3N4O4S/c1-19(2,29)13-10-15-12(11-27(26-15)7-8-32(3,30)31)9-16(13)25-18(28)14-5-4-6-17(24-14)20(21,22)23/h4-6,9-11,29H,7-8H2,1-3H3,(H,25,28); Key:OQAMEEFUUFJZRS-UHFFFAOYSA-N

Zabedosertib (BAY 1834845) is an experimental drug which acts as a selective inhibitor of the enzyme interleukin‐1 receptor‐associated kinase 4 (IRAK4). It has antiinflammatory effects and is being researched for possible applications in treating inflammatory conditions of the skin.

== See also ==
- Emavusertib
- Zimlovisertib
