= SLC71A2 =

Identifiers
- Aliases: SLC71A2, hippocampus abundant transcript-like protein 1, hippocampus abundant transcript-like 1, Major facilitator superfamily domain containing 14B, HIATL1
- External IDs: MGI: 1913881; GeneCards: SLC71A2

Gene location (Human)
Chr.	Chromosome 9 (human)
Band	9q22.32	Start	94,374,569 bp
Band	9q22.32	End	94,461,042 bp

Gene location (Mouse)
Chr.	Chromosome 13 (mouse)
Band	13|13 B3	Start	65,212,477 bp
Band	13|13 B3	End	65,260,789 bp
RNA expression pattern
Bgee	Human / Mouse (ortholog); Top expressed in: skin of arm; gingival epithelium; secondary oocyte; mucosa of ileum; pancreatic epithelial cell; palpebral conjunctiva; monocyte; epithelium of nasopharynx; tibia; skin of thigh / Top expressed in: granulocyte; skin of external ear; pineal gland; skin of back; molar; stroma of bone marrow; olfactory epithelium; atrium; left colon; fetal liver hematopoietic progenitor cell; More reference expression data
BioGPS	n/a
Gene ontology
Molecular function	transporter activity
Cellular component	membrane; integral component of membrane
Biological process	transmembrane transport
Sources:Amigo / QuickGO
Orthologs
Databases	NCBI: entry; OMA: entry
Species	Human	Mouse
Entrez	84641	66631
Ensembl	ENSG00000148110	ENSMUSG00000038212
UniProt	Q5SR56	Q8CIA9
RefSeq (mRNA)	NM_032558	NM_001083901; NM_133680
RefSeq (protein)	NP_115947	NP_001077370; NP_598441
Location (UCSC)	Chr 9: 94.37 – 94.46 Mb	Chr 13: 65.21 – 65.26 Mb
PubMed search
- Wikidata
View/Edit Human	View/Edit Mouse

Solute carrier family 71 member 2 is a protein that in humans is encoded by the gene SLC71A2 (previously MFSD14B and HIATL1). It has previously been described as an atypical solute carrier of MFS type. It is predicted to be located in intracellular membranes.

MFSD14B forms a cluster with AMTF1, together with MFSD9, MFSD10 and MFSD14A.
