= Mfsd11 =

Major facilitator superfamily domain containing 11 (MFSD11) is an atypical Solute carrier found in plasma membranes.

HGNC ID:25458

TCDB: 2.A.1.58.3

MFSD11 cluster to AMTF10.
