= Emavusertib =

Chemical compound

Identifiers
- IUPAC name: N-[5-[(3R)-3-hydroxypyrrolidin-1-yl]-2-morpholin-4-yl-[1,3]oxazolo[4,5-b]pyridin-6-yl]-2-(2-methylpyridin-4-yl)-1,3-oxazole-4-carboxamide
- CAS Number: 1801344-14-8
- PubChem CID: 118224491
- DrugBank: DB18060
- ChemSpider: 84492187
- UNII: MH5DMF9JKY
- ChEMBL: ChEMBL4783351

Chemical and physical data
- Formula: C_{24}H_{25}N_{7}O_{5}
- Molar mass: 491.508 g·mol^{−1}
- 3D model (JSmol): Interactive image
- SMILES: CC1=NC=CC(=C1)C2=NC(=CO2)C(=O)NC3=CC4=C(N=C3N5CC[C@H](C5)O)N=C(O4)N6CCOCC6
- InChI: InChI=1S/C24H25N7O5/c1-14-10-15(2-4-25-14)23-27-18(13-35-23)22(33)26-17-11-19-20(28-21(17)31-5-3-16(32)12-31)29-24(36-19)30-6-8-34-9-7-30/h2,4,10-11,13,16,32H,3,5-9,12H2,1H3,(H,26,33)/t16-/m1/s1; Key:SJHNWSAWWOAWJH-MRXNPFEDSA-N

Emavusertib (CA-4948) is a drug which acts as a selective inhibitor of the enzyme Interleukin-1 receptor-associated kinase 4 (IRAK-4) and was developed for the treatment of some forms of cancer.

== See also ==
- Zabedosertib
- Zimlovisertib
