= SLC33A2 =

MFSD3

Identifiers
- Aliases: MFSD3, major facilitator superfamily domain containing 3
- External IDs: MGI: 1916822; GeneCards: MFSD3

Gene location (Human)
Chr.	Chromosome 8 (human)
Band	8q24.3	Start	144,509,070 bp
Band	8q24.3	End	144,511,213 bp

Gene location (Mouse)
Chr.	Chromosome 15 (mouse)
Band	15|15 D3	Start	76,585,665 bp
Band	15|15 D3	End	76,588,439 bp
RNA expression pattern
Bgee	Human / Mouse (ortholog); Top expressed in: mucosa of transverse colon; apex of heart; right lobe of liver; right frontal lobe; right lobe of thyroid gland; right hemisphere of cerebellum; left lobe of thyroid gland; right adrenal cortex; Brodmann area 9; cingulate gyrus / Top expressed in: left lobe of liver; masseter muscle; quadriceps femoris muscle; muscle of thigh; vastus lateralis muscle; skeletal muscle tissue; proximal tubule; medial head of gastrocnemius muscle; soleus muscle; tibialis anterior muscle; More reference expression data
BioGPS	n/a
Gene ontology
Molecular function	solute:proton symporter activity
Cellular component	integral component of membrane; membrane; integral component of plasma membrane
Biological process	transmembrane transport; proton transmembrane transport
Sources:Amigo / QuickGO
Orthologs
Databases	NCBI: entry; OMA: entry
Species	Human	Mouse
Entrez	113655	69572
Ensembl	ENSG00000167700	ENSMUSG00000019080
UniProt	Q96ES6	Q5U419
RefSeq (mRNA)	NM_138431	NM_027122
RefSeq (protein)	NP_612440	NP_081398
Location (UCSC)	Chr 8: 144.51 – 144.51 Mb	Chr 15: 76.59 – 76.59 Mb
PubMed search
- Wikidata
View/Edit Human	View/Edit Mouse

Solute carrier family 33 member 2 is a protein that in humans is encoded by the SLC33A2 gene. It was previously designated major facilitator superfamily domain containing 3 (MFSD3). It belongs to the major facilitator superfamily (MFS) Pfam clan. It is an Atypical solute carrier located to the neuronal plasma membrane.

HGNC:25157

TCDB: 2.A.1.25.4

MFSD3 belongs to AMTF15.
