= Innate immune defect =

An innate immune defect is a defect in the innate immune response that blunts the response to infection. These defects may occur in monocytes, neutrophils, natural killer cells, basophils, mast cells or complement proteins.

== Types ==
=== Toll-like Receptor (TLR) immunodeficiencies ===
Several TLR immunodeficiencies have been described in which cellular proteins that should transmit the message from the TLRs to the nucleus are abnormal. These signaling defects result in a failure of cytokines to be produced in response to bacterial infection. Disorders of this type include MyD88 deficiency, IRAK-4 deficiency other UNC93B deficiency and TLR3 mutations.

==== MyD88 deficiency ====
Myeloid differentiation primary response gene 88 (MyD88) deficiency is a disorder of the innate immune system. It belongs to rare primary immunodeficiency characterized by an increased susceptibility to certain types of bacterial infections. Patients suffer from abnormally frequent and severe infections by a subset of bacteria known as pyogenic bacteria such as Staphylococcus aureus, Streptococcus pneumoniae and Pseudomonas aeruginosa. However, affected individuals have normal resistance to other common bacteria, viruses, fungi, and parasites. MYD88 deficiency is caused by mutations in the MYD88 gene and is inherited in an autosomal recessive manner. MYD88 gene provides instructions for making a protein that plays an important role in stimulating the immune system to respond to bacterial infection. The MyD88 protein is part of a signaling pathway that is involved in early recognition of pathogens and the initiation of inflammation to fight infection. This signaling pathway is part of the innate immune response. Most people with this condition have their first bacterial infection before age 2, and the infections can be life-threatening in infancy and childhood. Infections become less frequent by about age 10.

==== IRAK4 deficiency ====
Interleukin-1 receptor-associated kinase deficiency is an inherited disorder of the immune system. This immunodeficiency leads to recurrent infections caused by the pyogenic bacteria, for example Streptococcus pneumoniae, Staphylococcus aureus and Pseudomonas aeruginosa, but not by other infectious agents. Most patients with IRAK-4 deficiency suffer from invasive bacterial infections, which can cause sepsis, meningitis or they affect the joints that can lead to inflammation and arthritis. These invasive infections can also cause areas of tissue breakdown and pus production (abscesses) on internal organs. In addition, patients are characterized by infections of the upper respiratory tract, eyes or skin. Although fever is a common reaction to bacterial infections, many people with IRAK-4 deficiency do not at first develop a high fever in response to these infections, even if the infection is severe. Most patients have their first bacterial infection before age 2, and the infections can be life-threatening in infancy and childhood. Infections become less frequent with age.

==== UNC93B and TLR3 deficiency ====
UNC93B1 is very important signaling molecule involved in the production of interferon which plays a key role in the killing of viruses. Signaling through TLRs 3, 7, 8, and 9 normally induces production of interferons that are binding to viral RNA and destroy the virus. Deficiency of UNC93B1 or TLR3 leads for example to susceptibility to encephalitis caused by herpes simplex virus (HSV-1) due to decreased production of interferons in the central nervous system.

=== Defects in IFN-γ/IL-12 signaling ===
Interferon-γ (IFN-γ)/interleukin-12 (IL-12) pathway deficiencies belongs to rare innate immune defects. They are characterized by susceptibility to salmonella infections and also mycobacteria. Mycobacteria is the family of bacteria which cause tuberculosis and other related infections. This deficiency usually occurs in children after tuberculosis vaccination. The other typical symptoms may be different skin infections, swollen lymph nodes or blood stream infections with an enlarged liver and spleen.

== Diagnosis ==
Patients with innate immune defects have generally intact adaptive immune systems with normal antibodies and T-cells. The main symptom is increased level of eosinophils in the blood, but elevated immunoglobulin E (IgE) levels may also be present. The diagnosis is made in suspected patients by measuring cytokine production by white blood cells, after stimulation by bacterial products. Testing of TLR function is becoming available through commercial reference laboratories. By abnormal tests is usually made repeat testing and also genetic testing.

== Treatment ==
The common treatment for these defects usually involves antibiotic therapy to treat acute infections. Prophylactic antibiotic therapy is also used. Some patients require immunoglobulin treatment.
