= MFSD1 =

Protein-coding gene in the species Homo sapiens

Identifiers
- Aliases: MFSD1, SMAP4, major facilitator superfamily domain containing 1, Minerva
- External IDs: MGI: 1914118; GeneCards: MFSD1

Gene location (Human)
Chr.	Chromosome 3 (human)
Band	3q25.32	Start	158,732,198 bp
Band	3q25.32	End	158,829,719 bp

Gene location (Mouse)
Chr.	Chromosome 3 (mouse)
Band	3|3 E1	Start	67,490,074 bp
Band	3|3 E1	End	67,511,570 bp
RNA expression pattern
Bgee	Human / Mouse (ortholog); Top expressed in: monocyte; trabecular bone; palpebral conjunctiva; visceral pleura; epithelium of nasopharynx; parietal pleura; gums; skin of hip; parotid gland; gingival epithelium / Top expressed in: stroma of bone marrow; right kidney; yolk sac; human kidney; proximal tubule; olfactory epithelium; primitive streak; lactiferous gland; submandibular gland; calvaria; More reference expression data
BioGPS	n/a
Orthologs
Databases	NCBI: entry; OMA: entry
Species	Human	Mouse
Entrez	64747	66868
Ensembl	ENSG00000118855	ENSMUSG00000027775
UniProt	Q9H3U5	Q9DC37
RefSeq (mRNA)	NM_001167903; NM_001289406; NM_001289407; NM_022736	NM_025813
RefSeq (protein)	NP_001161375; NP_001276335; NP_001276336; NP_073573	NP_080089
Location (UCSC)	Chr 3: 158.73 – 158.83 Mb	Chr 3: 67.49 – 67.51 Mb
PubMed search
- Wikidata
View/Edit Human	View/Edit Mouse

Major facilitator superfamily domain containing 1 (MFSD1, SMAP) is a protein belonging to the MFS Pfam clan. It is an Atypical solute carrier.

It belongs to the major facilitator superfamily MFS Pfam Clan. MFSD1 has been identified in neuronal plasma membranes and lysosomes.

MFSD1 belongs to AMTF6.
