= IRAK4 =

Protein-coding gene in humans

Identifiers
- Aliases: IRAK4, IPD1, IRAK-4, NY-REN-64, REN64, interleukin 1 receptor associated kinase 4, IMD67
- External IDs: OMIM: 606883; MGI: 2182474; GeneCards: IRAK4
Available structures
PDB	Ortholog search: PDBe RCSB
PDB	List of PDB id codes 2NRU, 2NRY, 2O8Y, 2OIB, 2OIC, 2OID, 3MOP, 4U97, 4U9A, 4XS2, 4Y73, 4YO6, 4YP8, 4ZTL, 4ZTM, 4ZTN, 4RMZ
Enzyme activity
EC #	BRENDA	ExPASy	KEGG	MetaCyc
2.7.11.1	↗	↗	↗	↗

Gene location (Human)
Chr.	Chromosome 12 (human)
Band	12q12	Start	43,758,944 bp
Band	12q12	End	43,798,307 bp

Gene location (Mouse)
Chr.	Chromosome 15 (mouse)
Band	15|15 E3	Start	94,441,524 bp
Band	15|15 E3	End	94,479,696 bp
RNA expression pattern
Bgee	Human / Mouse (ortholog); Top expressed in: monocyte; body of pancreas; granulocyte; rectum; gallbladder; lymph node; blood; Achilles tendon; spleen; appendix / Top expressed in: granulocyte; jejunum; tibiofemoral joint; duodenum; conjunctival fornix; stroma of bone marrow; yolk sac; intestinal villus; blood; lumbar subsegment of spinal cord; More reference expression data
BioGPS	n/a
Gene ontology
Molecular function	nucleotide binding; protein kinase activity; magnesium ion binding; transferase activity; interleukin-1 receptor binding; kinase activity; ATP binding; protein binding; protein serine/threonine kinase activity
Cellular component	endosome membrane; cytoplasm; cytosol; nucleus; plasma membrane; extracellular space; intracellular anatomical structure
Biological process	JNK cascade; signal transduction; toll-like receptor 9 signaling pathway; neutrophil migration; toll-like receptor signaling pathway; protein phosphorylation; positive regulation of smooth muscle cell proliferation; neutrophil mediated immunity; MyD88-dependent toll-like receptor signaling pathway; cytokine-mediated signaling pathway; innate immune response; positive regulation of I-kappaB kinase/NF-kappaB signaling; cytokine production; immune system process; phosphorylation; positive regulation of NF-kappaB transcription factor activity; interleukin-1-mediated signaling pathway; intracellular signal transduction
Sources:Amigo / QuickGO
Orthologs
Databases	NCBI: entry; OMA: entry
Species	Human	Mouse
Entrez	51135	266632
Ensembl	ENSG00000198001	ENSMUSG00000059883
UniProt	Q9NWZ3; Q69FE3	Q8R4K2
RefSeq (mRNA)	NM_001114182; NM_001145256; NM_001145257; NM_001145258; NM_016123 NM_001351338; NM_001351339; NM_001351340; NM_001351341; NM_001351342; NM_001351343; NM_001351344; NM_001351345	NM_029926
RefSeq (protein)	NP_001107654; NP_001138728; NP_001138729; NP_001138730; NP_057207 NP_001338267; NP_001338268; NP_001338269; NP_001338270; NP_001338271; NP_001338272; NP_001338273; NP_001338274; NP_001107654.1; NP_057207.2	NP_084202
Location (UCSC)	Chr 12: 43.76 – 43.8 Mb	Chr 15: 94.44 – 94.48 Mb
PubMed search
- Wikidata
View/Edit Human	View/Edit Mouse

IRAK-4 (interleukin-1 receptor-associated kinase 4), in the IRAK family, is a protein kinase involved in signaling innate immune responses from Toll-like receptors. It also supports signaling from T-cell receptors. IRAK4 contains domain structures which are similar to those of IRAK1, IRAK2, IRAK3 and Pelle. IRAK4 is unique compared to IRAK1, IRAK2 and IRAKM in that it functions upstream of the other IRAKs, but is more similar to Pelle in this trait. IRAK4 has important clinical applications.

Animals without IRAK-4 are more susceptible to viruses and bacteria but completely resistant to LPS challenge.

== History ==
The first IL-1 receptor-associated kinase (IRAK) was observed in 1994 through experiments with murine T helper cell lines D10N and EL-4. Two years later the first experimental member of this family of kinases, IRAK1, was cloned. In 2002, through database searches at the National Center for Biotechnology Information in an attempt to recognize novel members of the IRAK family, a human cDNA sequence which encoded a peptide sharing significant homology with IRAK1 was identified. This cDNA sequence was found to have five amino acid substitutions compared to IRAK1 and was termed IRAK4.

IRAK4 was proposed to be the mammalian homolog of the Pelle gene found in Drosophila melanogaster and was proposed to require its kinase activity in order for it to function in activating NF-κB. It was also proposed by Li et al. that it might function upstream of other IRAKs and possibly cause a cascade of phosphorylation events through its function as an IRAK1 kinase. This idea of a cascade of phosphorylation events was supported by a study where an IRAK4 knockout in mice showed a more severe phenotype than other IRAK knockout experiments and signalling through Toll/IL-1 receptor (TIR) is virtually eliminated.

In 2007 it was found that IRAK4 activity was necessary for activating signal pathways which lead to mitogen-activated protein kinases (MAPK), or Toll-like receptor-mediated immune responses (TLR), but was not essential to T-cell Receptor (TCR) signalling as was originally proposed.

== Protein structure ==
IRAK4 is a threonine/serine protein kinase made up of 460 amino acids, which contains both a kinase domain and a death domain. Its kinase domain exhibits the typical bilobed structure of kinases, with the N-terminal lobe consisting of a five-stranded antiparallel beta-sheet and one alpha helix. The C-terminal lobe is composed mainly of a number of alpha helices. Also contained within IRAK4's N-terminal is an extension of twenty amino acids, which is unique to IRAK4 among kinases, even within the IRAK family. Situated where the two lobes meet is an ATP binding site, which is covered by a tyrosine gatekeeper. Tyrosine as a gatekeeper is believed to be unique to the IRAK family of kinases. The protein also contains three auto-phosphorylation sites, each of which when mutated results in a decrease in the kinase activity of IRAK4.

A structure of the autophosphorylation of the activation loop has been determined in which the activation loop Thr345 of one monomer is sitting in the active site of another monomer in the crystal (PDB: 4U9A, 4U97).

== Function, mechanism, signalling pathway ==
Members of interleukin-1 receptor (Il-1R) and the Toll-like receptor superfamily share an intracytoplasmic Toll-IL-1 receptor (TIR) domain, which mediates recruitment of the interleukin-1 receptor-associated kinase (IRAK) complex via TIR-containing adapter molecules. The TIR-IRAK signaling pathway appears to be crucial for protective immunity against specific bacteria but is redundant against most other microorganisms. IRAK4 is considered the “master IRAK” in the mammalian IRAK family because it is the only component in the IL-1/TLR signalling pathway that is absolutely crucial to its functioning. When one of these pathways is stimulated, the cell is triggered to release proinflammatory signals and to trigger innate immune actions. The loss of IRAK4, or its intrinsic kinase activity, can entirely stop signalling through these pathways.

IRAK4 is involved in signal transduction pathways stimulated by the cellular receptors belonging to the Toll/Interleukin-1 receptor superfamily. The Toll-Like Receptors (TLRs) are stimulated by recognition of pathogen-associated molecular patterns (PAMPS), whereas members of the IL-1R family are stimulated by cytokines. Both play an essential role in the immune response. The ligand binding causes conformational changes to the intracellular domain which allows for the recruitment of scaffolding proteins. One of these proteins, MyD88, uses its death domains to recruit, orient, and activate IRAK4. IRAK2 can then be phosphorylated and joins with IRAK4 and MyD88 to form the myddosome complex, which further phosphorylates and recruits IRAK1. The myddosome complex and IRAK1 recruit and activate TNF receptor-associated factor 6 (TRAF6), a ubiquitin protein ligase. TRAF6 can polyubiquitinate IKK-γ as well as itself, which recruits TGF-β activated kinase 1 (TAK1) in order to activate its ability to phosphorylate IKK-β. These pathways both work to degrade IKKγ, which releases NFκB and free it for translocation into the nucleus. Additionally, TAK1 can activate JNK to induce a MAP kinase pathway which leads to AP-1-induced gene expression. Together, AP-1 and NFκB lead to increased cytokine transcription, adhesion molecule production, and release of second messengers of infection.

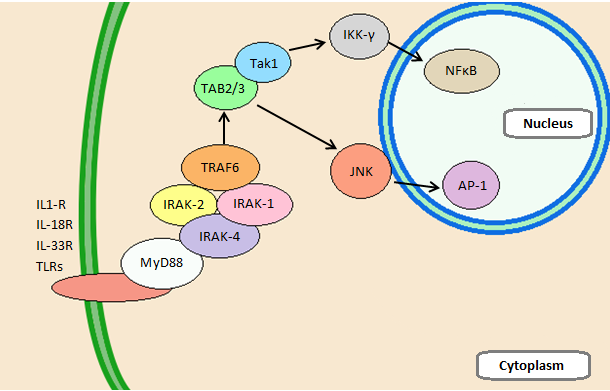
Overview of signalling pathway through IRAK4 and the myddosome complex.

Central to all of these signalling pathways is the kinase IRAK4. Results show that IRAK4 is a crucial component in an animal's response to IL-1. Animals deficient in this kinase were found to be lacking in the ability to recognize viral and bacterial invaders, and were completely resistant to lethal doses of lipopolysaccharide (LPS). This is due to IRAK4's function as both a structural protein and as a kinase. Both of these functions are required for the myddosome complex formation. Additionally, IRAK4 has been shown to be absolutely essential in a TLR signalling. IRAK4 deficient mice have a profoundly impaired ability to produce IL-6, TNF-α, and IL-12 in response to TLR ligands. However it is worthy of note that despite its importance to many immune signalling pathways, IRAK4 does not appear to be involved in TCR signalling.

== Clinical significance ==
There are three components of evidence that illustrate IRAK4's involvement in TLR signalling. First, IRAK4 is the initial kinase near the TLR receptor to activate downstream effectors such as cytokines and chemokines in the inflammatory cascade. Second, deletion of the IRAK4 gene results in various cytokine response defects and finally, patients with IRAK4 deficiency have displayed defective immunity in response to IL-1, IL-8 and other TLR binding ligands. Considering IRAK4's downstream position of these signalling events, it is an important drug therapy target for various inflammatory disorders including rheumatoid arthritis, inflammatory bowel disease and other autoimmune diseases.

=== Prostate cancer ===
An important area of research currently being explored is the role the IRAK4 gene may play in the development of prostate cancer. There are several interacting factors that lead to the development of this disease however genetic susceptibility of chronic inflammation has been deemed one of the most important. It has been found that mutations in the IRAK4 gene can lead to dysfunctional TLR signalling and ultimately result in increased innate immune responses and therefore an increased inflammatory response. Over time, this can lead to the onset of prostate cancer.

=== Melanoma ===
Another interesting application of the IRAK4 gene was found in a study involving human melanoma patients. This research found that patients with melanin-cell tumors displayed an increase in the phosphorylation state of IRAK4. The siRNA inhibition of IRAK4 in mice displayed greater programmed cell death (PCD) and slowed tumor growth.

IRAK4 is higher levels in some lines of melanoma. By reducing IRAK4 activity it may be possible to identify new chemotherapeutic agents to treat patients with advanced melanoma for which no effective treatment is available.

=== Pancreatic cancer ===
In a mice model, administering IRAK4 reduced inflammatory signaling, after which T-cells began to attack tumors and immunotherapy became more effective.

=== Drug target ===
A common concern with IRAK4 drug therapy or knockdown is if its absence would result in unbearable side effects considering IRAK4 plays an extremely central role in the TLR signalling pathway. Children with IRAK4 deficiency have been found to have decreased immunity to some specific bacterial infections yet not to viral, parasitic or other microbe infections. However, as these children enter adulthood and maternal antibodies are no longer present, susceptibility to infections becomes a rarity. In one study, no significant bacterial infections were documented in all investigated patients over the age of 14 with IRAK4 deficiency. This may mean that in later stages of life, IRAK4 inhibition could provide benefits against certain diseases while maintaining immunity.

The next step in this area of research is the formation of safe IRAK4 inhibitors. There has been modest progress in the development of some potential inhibitors of IRAK4 in which their mechanism works by blocking its tyrosine gated ATP binding site. As of 2024 all potential drugs are in the early preclinical stages of development.

Early-stage clinical trials of an IRAK4 inhibitor had started by 2019. Moreover, IRAK4 protein degraders have recently entered clinical trials, most notably one from Kymera Therapeutics.

== Inhibitors ==
- Emavusertib (CA-4948)
- Zabedosertib (BAY 1834845)
- Zimlovisertib (PF-06650833)
