= Cell ablation =

Cell ablation (from Latin Cellula "small chamber" and Ablatio "removal"). Also known as tissue ablation, cell ablation is a biotechnological tool for studying cell lineage. The process consists of selectively destroying or removing cells in an organism.

For example, a laser beam or controllable gene promoter for a toxin gene can be used to destroy a selected amount of cells.

Cell ablation can also be used as a tool to produce transgenic organisms lacking a cell type, and as a cure for certain diseases such as cancer.

The term is not to be confused with genetic ablation: a method of modifying DNA in order to disrupt the production of a specific gene.

There are multiple different techniques of cell ablation (laser ablation, thermal ablation, etc...). Many of which are being utilized in biomedical sciences to study cell functions

== Laser cell ablation ==
Laser was used during the early stages of cell ablation, utilizing the flexibility, precision and heat generated from concentrated light waves (laser). Laser ablation was extremely effective in destroying cells in vitro, as intensity of light was easily manipulated to injure cells. Laser ablation is not recommended for in vivo, as the potential damage from laser was too high. High cost of operation, and extensive operating time narrowed its accessibility for cell studies.

Recently, laser ablation was applied with ICP-MS to develop LA-ICP-MS analysis technique. In which utilizes the precision and ability to change laser intensity to determine elemental distribution of biological samples.

== Thermal cell ablation ==
Thermal ablation is widely used in biomedical science as a form of heat therapy for cancer. Extreme heat are applied to tumors, damaging the tissues to eliminate the tumors from eligible patients. Similarly, cryoablation can also be used as a potential treatment. Sudden drop to freezing temperature can cause crystal formation, puncturing membranes and causing cell death.

Radiofrequency ablation (RFA) utilizes high frequency sound waves to produce heat as a mean to destroy cells. RFA is frequently used as a minimally-evasive treatment for small tumors.
