= Lactose permease =

Membrane protein

LacY proton/sugar symporter
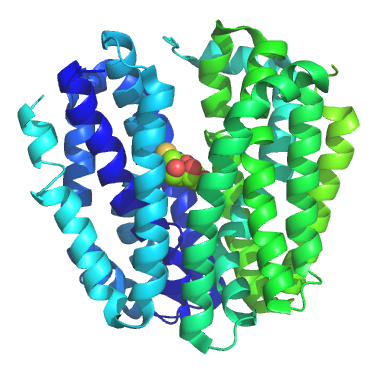
- Crystal Structure of Lactose Permease in Complex with an Affinity Inactivator. PDB 2y5y

Identifiers
- Symbol: LacY_symp
- Pfam: PF01306
- Pfam clan: CL0015
- InterPro: IPR022814
- PROSITE: PDOC00698
- TCDB: 2.A.1
- OPM superfamily: 15
- OPM protein: 2cfq
Available protein structures:
- PDB: IPR022814 PF01306 (ECOD; PDBsum)
- AlphaFold: IPR022814; PF01306

Lactose permease is a membrane protein which is a member of the major facilitator superfamily. Lactose permease can be classified as a symporter, which uses the proton gradient towards the cell to transport β-galactosides such as lactose in the same direction into the cell.

The protein has twelve transmembrane alpha-helices and its molecular weight is 45,000 daltons. It exhibits an internal two-fold symmetry, relating the N-terminal six helices onto the C-terminal helices. It is encoded by the lacY gene in the lac operon. The LacY gene is a component of the lac operon that encodes lactose permease, a protein responsible for breaking down lactose into glucose and galactose, alongside transacetylase and beta galactosidase. The absence of lactose permease leads to the inability of lactose to enter the cell for further metabolic processes. Therefore, lactose permease plays a crucial role in the utilization of lactose as a source of energy. LacY, a protein responsible for the transport of lactose across the membrane in Escherichia coli. LacY has a flexible structure consisting of 12 transmembrane helices. The N- and C-terminal domains are symmetric, suggesting they have the same genetic origin. The substrate-binding site is in the N-terminal domain, with residues like Trp151 and Arg144 playing important roles in sugar binding. The C-terminal domain has fewer interactions with TDG, but residues like Lys358 and Asp237 contribute to its binding. Thiol cross-linking underestimates distances, especially on the cytoplasmic side, due to the molecule's fluctuations between inward- and outward-facing conformations.

The sugar lies in the hydrophilic core of the protein which is accessible from the periplasm. On binding, a large conformational change takes place which makes the sugar binding site accessible from the cytoplasm. Glutamine residues in positions 241 and 359 guide the sugar towards Phe 27, which brings the substrate to Gln 126 where it is firmly fixed. Carefully positioned amino acids help the substrate to overcome the energy barrier of around 20 kJ/mol.

The X-ray crystal structure was first solved in 2003 by J. Abramson et al.

== The "Six State" Mechanism ==
The mechanism known as the "six-state" pertains to the six distinct functional conformations or states involved in the cotransport process of the lactose permease cotransporter. In state 1/4 the LacY protein, adopts an outward/inward-facing conformation respectively. Subsequently, through rapid binding of a hydrogen ion, it transitions to state 2. During state 3, the cotransporter captures a lactose molecule while maintaining an outward-facing conformation. States 5/6 are after dissociating the lactose/proton.

Hydronium ions from the outside of the cell binds to a carboxyl group on the enzyme that allows it to undergo a conformational change. This form of lactose permease can bind lactose from outside the cell. The enzyme then everts and lactose is transported inward.
