= Zimlovisertib =

Chemical compound

Identifiers
- IUPAC name: 1-[[(2S,3S,4S)-3-ethyl-4-fluoro-5-oxopyrrolidin-2-yl]methoxy]-7-methoxyisoquinoline-6-carboxamide
- CAS Number: 1817626-54-2
- PubChem CID: 118414016
- DrugBank: DB15143
- ChemSpider: 58805665
- UNII: S3F315JJXI
- ChEMBL: ChEMBL4081711

Chemical and physical data
- Formula: C_{18}H_{20}FN_{3}O_{4}
- Molar mass: 361.373 g·mol^{−1}
- 3D model (JSmol): Interactive image
- SMILES: CC[C@H]1[C@H](NC(=O)[C@H]1F)COC2=NC=CC3=CC(=C(C=C32)OC)C(=O)N
- InChI: InChI=1S/C18H20FN3O4/c1-3-10-13(22-17(24)15(10)19)8-26-18-11-7-14(25-2)12(16(20)23)6-9(11)4-5-21-18/h4-7,10,13,15H,3,8H2,1-2H3,(H2,20,23)(H,22,24)/t10-,13+,15-/m0/s1; Key:JKDGKIBAOAFRPJ-ZBINZKHDSA-N

Zimlovisertib (PF-06650833) is a drug which acts as a selective inhibitor of the enzyme Interleukin-1 receptor-associated kinase 4 (IRAK-4). It has antiinflammatory effects and has been trialed for various indications including hidradenitis suppurativa and treatment of COVID-19 infection, and while it has not been adopted into clinical use it continues to be used for research in this area.

== See also ==
- Emavusertib
- Zabedosertib
