= Arterial tortuosity syndrome =

Arterial tortuosity syndrome (ATS)
- Arterial tortuosity syndrome has an autosomal recessive pattern of inheritance
- Specialty: Cardiology
- Symptoms: Congenital diaphragmatic hernia
- Causes: Mutations in SLC2A10 gene
- Diagnostic method: CT scan, MRI
- Treatment: Possible surgery for aortic aneurysms

Arterial tortuosity syndrome is an extremely rare congenital connective tissue condition disorder characterized by tortuosity, elongation, stenosis, or aneurysms in major and medium-size arteries including the aorta.

== Signs and symptoms ==
Major manifestations affect the cardiovascular system.

- Tortuosity and elongation of major and medium sized arteries.
- Stenosis or narrowing of major and medium sized arteries.
- Aneurysms or dilations of major and medium sized arteries
- Aortic valve regurgitation
- Hypertension

Non-cardiac signs and symptoms demonstrated by this condition include:

- Arachnodactyly
- Autonomic dysfunction
- Blepharophimosis
- Congenital diaphragmatic hernia
- Keratoconus
- Mental dysfunction
- Telangiectasia (small clusters of enlarged blood vessels just under the skin).

== Genetics ==
Chr 20

Arterial tortuosity syndrome exhibits autosomal recessive inheritance, and the responsible gene is located at chromosome 20q13. The gene associated with arterial tortuosity syndrome is SLC2A10 and has at least 23 mutations in those individuals found to have the aforementioned condition.

== Pathophysiology ==
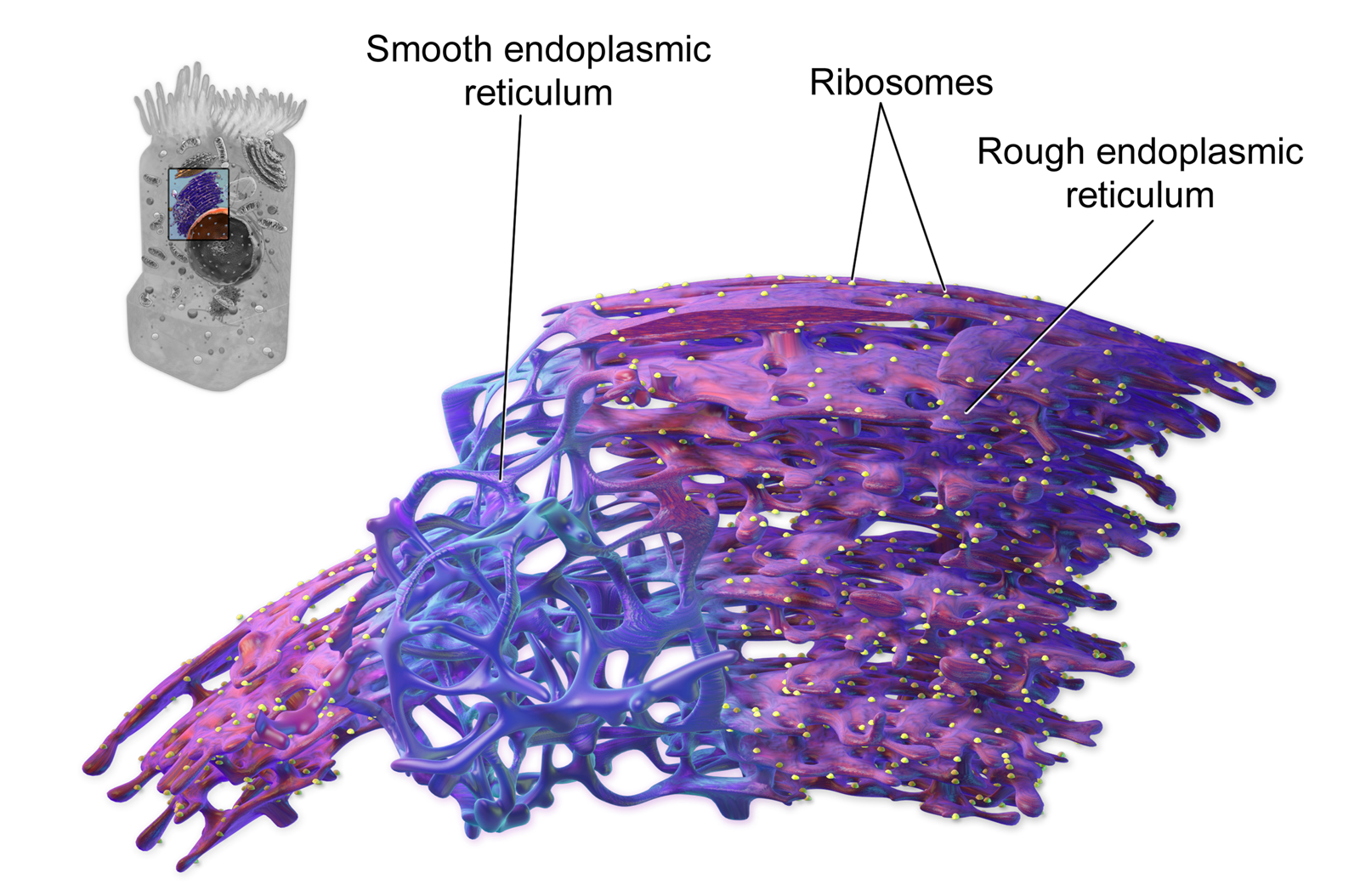

The mechanism of this condition is apparently controlled by (or due to) the SLC2A10 gene. The molecular genetic pathogenesis finds that the SLC2A10 gene encodes the GLUT10 protein which is found in the nuclear membrane, or the endoplasmic reticulum, the latter of which GLUT10 transports DHA into. Clinically speaking, according to one review, the condition of tortuosity is seen more with the advance of age.

== Diagnosis ==
The diagnosis of Arterial Tortuosity Syndrome is established in a person with (1) generalized arterial tortuosity and (2) positive molecular genetic testing that identifies a pathogenic mutation in the SLC2A10 gene. Generalized arterial tortuosity can be identified through the following:

- Physical examination
- Echocardiogram
- CT or MRI imaging and angiography

== Treatment ==
Individuals with ATS benefit from a coordinated approach of multidisciplinary specialists in a medical center familiar with ATS. No evidence-based clinical practice guidelines for arterial tortuosity syndrome (ATS) have been published.

The treatment of arterial tortuosity syndrome entails possible surgery for aortic aneurysms, as well as regular clinical surveillance including regular follow-up echocardiograms.

The prognosis and lifespan of this condition are unclear. Early reports of mortality were high, but more recent data suggests about 12% mortality.
