= FLVCR2 =

Protein-coding gene in the species Homo sapiens

Identifiers
- Aliases: FLVCR2, C14orf58, CCT, EPV, FLVCRL14q, MFSD7C, PVHH, feline leukemia virus subgroup C cellular receptor family member 2, SLC49A2, FLVCR heme transporter 2
- External IDs: OMIM: 610865; MGI: 2384974; GeneCards: FLVCR2

Gene location (Human)
Chr.	Chromosome 14 (human)
Band	14q24.3	Start	75,578,620 bp
Band	14q24.3	End	75,663,214 bp

Gene location (Mouse)
Chr.	Chromosome 12 (mouse)
Band	12|12 D2	Start	85,793,313 bp
Band	12|12 D2	End	85,860,359 bp
RNA expression pattern
Bgee	Human / Mouse (ortholog); Top expressed in: secondary oocyte; tibial nerve; monocyte; sperm; right testis; left testis; right adrenal cortex; left adrenal cortex; mucosa of ileum; right lobe of liver / Top expressed in: retinal pigment epithelium; morula; morula; blastocyst; yolk sac; spermatid; proximal tubule; right kidney; spermatocyte; seminiferous tubule; More reference expression data
BioGPS	n/a
Gene ontology
Molecular function	heme transmembrane transporter activity; heme binding
Cellular component	integral component of membrane; plasma membrane; membrane
Biological process	transmembrane transport; heme transport; heme export
Sources:Amigo / QuickGO
Orthologs
Databases	NCBI: entry; OMA: entry
Species	Human	Mouse
Entrez	55640	217721
Ensembl	ENSG00000119686	ENSMUSG00000034258
UniProt	Q9UPI3	Q91X85
RefSeq (mRNA)	NM_017791; NM_001195283	NM_145447
RefSeq (protein)	NP_001182212; NP_060261	NP_663422
Location (UCSC)	Chr 14: 75.58 – 75.66 Mb	Chr 12: 85.79 – 85.86 Mb
PubMed search
- Wikidata
View/Edit Human	View/Edit Mouse

Feline leukemia virus subgroup C cellular receptor family, member 2 (FLVCR2) is a choline transporter belonging to the major facilitator superfamily (MFS). It is a uniporter transmembrane protein that transports choline across the plasma membrane via a concentration gradient. FLVCR2 is highly enriched in endothelial cells of the blood-brain barrier but is also expressed in peripheral tissues such as the small intestine where it absorbs dietary choline. At the blood-brain barrier, FLVCR2 is the primary transporter of choline responsible for approximately 60% of the brains supply.

Mutations in FLVCR2 have been associated with proliferative vasculopathy and hydranencephaly-hydrocephaly syndrome (Fowler syndrome).

== Discovery ==
In 2009, the feline FLVCR2 ortholog was the first identified as a receptor of the Feline leukemia virus (FeLV) in cats. The following year, it was characterised as a heme transporter as it was shown to bind heme, increase heme transport. However, in 2024 it was shown to transport choline both in vivo and in vitro through the use of radiolabel choline transport assays and structural characterisation showing choline bound. FLVCR2's role in disease and interactions with heme remains an ongoing investigation.

== Structure ==
FLVCR2 is a 60 kDa protein that adopts the canonical MFS fold consisting of 12 transmembrane alpha-helices with no significant extracellular structures or glycosylation. These helices are organized into two distinct pseudo-symmetrical bundles: the N-terminal and C-terminal domains—which are both oriented towards the cytosol. Together, these domains pack against one another to create a central aqueous cavity that serves as the translocation pathway for substrates such as choline. The protein operates through an alternating-access mechanism, often described as a "rocker-switch" motion, where the helices undergo conformational shifts to transition the central pore between outward-facing, occluded, and inward-facing states.
