= SLC2A10 =

Protein-coding gene in the species Homo sapiens

Identifiers
- Aliases: SLC2A10, ATS, GLUT10, solute carrier family 2 member 10, ATORS
- External IDs: OMIM: 606145; MGI: 2156687; GeneCards: SLC2A10

Gene location (Human)
| Chr. | Chromosome 20 (human) |
| Band | 20q13.12 | Start | 46,709,649 bp |
| Band | 20q13.12 | End | 46,736,347 bp |

Gene location (Mouse)
| Chr. | Chromosome 2 (mouse) |
| Band | 2 H3|2 85.66 cM | Start | 165,345,707 bp |
| Band | 2 H3|2 85.66 cM | End | 165,361,837 bp |
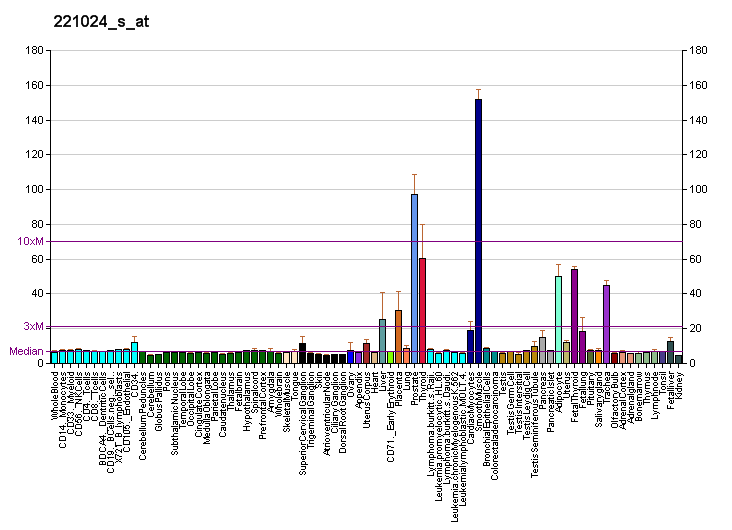
RNA expression pattern
| Bgee | Human / Mouse (ortholog); Top expressed in: tibia; bronchial epithelial cell; stromal cell of endometrium; palpebral conjunctiva; Epithelium of choroid plexus; decidua; olfactory zone of nasal mucosa; right lobe of liver; prostate; nasal epithelium / Top expressed in: pyloric antrum; epithelium of stomach; ascending aorta; aortic valve; mucous cell of stomach; calvaria; secondary oocyte; vestibular membrane of cochlear duct; body of femur; primary oocyte; More reference expression data |
| BioGPS | More reference expression data |
Gene ontology
| Molecular function | glucose transmembrane transporter activity; carbohydrate:proton symporter activity; transmembrane transporter activity; transporter activity; D-glucose transmembrane transporter activity |
| Cellular component | perinuclear region of cytoplasm; integral component of membrane; plasma membrane; membrane; endomembrane system; cytoplasm; integral component of plasma membrane |
| Biological process | carbohydrate transport; glucose import; transmembrane transport; hexose transmembrane transport; proton transmembrane transport; glucose transmembrane transport |
Sources:Amigo / QuickGO
Orthologs
| Databases | NCBI: entry; OMA: entry |
| Species | Human | Mouse |
| Entrez | 81031 | 170441 |
| Ensembl | ENSG00000197496 | ENSMUSG00000027661 |
| UniProt | O95528 | Q8VHD6 |
| RefSeq (mRNA) | NM_030777 | NM_130451 |
| RefSeq (protein) | NP_110404 | NP_569718 |
| Location (UCSC) | Chr 20: 46.71 – 46.74 Mb | Chr 2: 165.35 – 165.36 Mb |
| PubMed search |
- Wikidata
| View/Edit Human | View/Edit Mouse |

Solute carrier family 2, facilitated glucose transporter member 10 is a protein that in humans is encoded by the SLC2A10 gene.

SLC2A10 is a member of the facilitative glucose transporter family, which plays a significant role in maintaining glucose homeostasis.[supplied by OMIM]

== See also ==
- Glucose transporter
- Solute carrier family
- Arterial tortuosity syndrome
