= Genetic ablation =

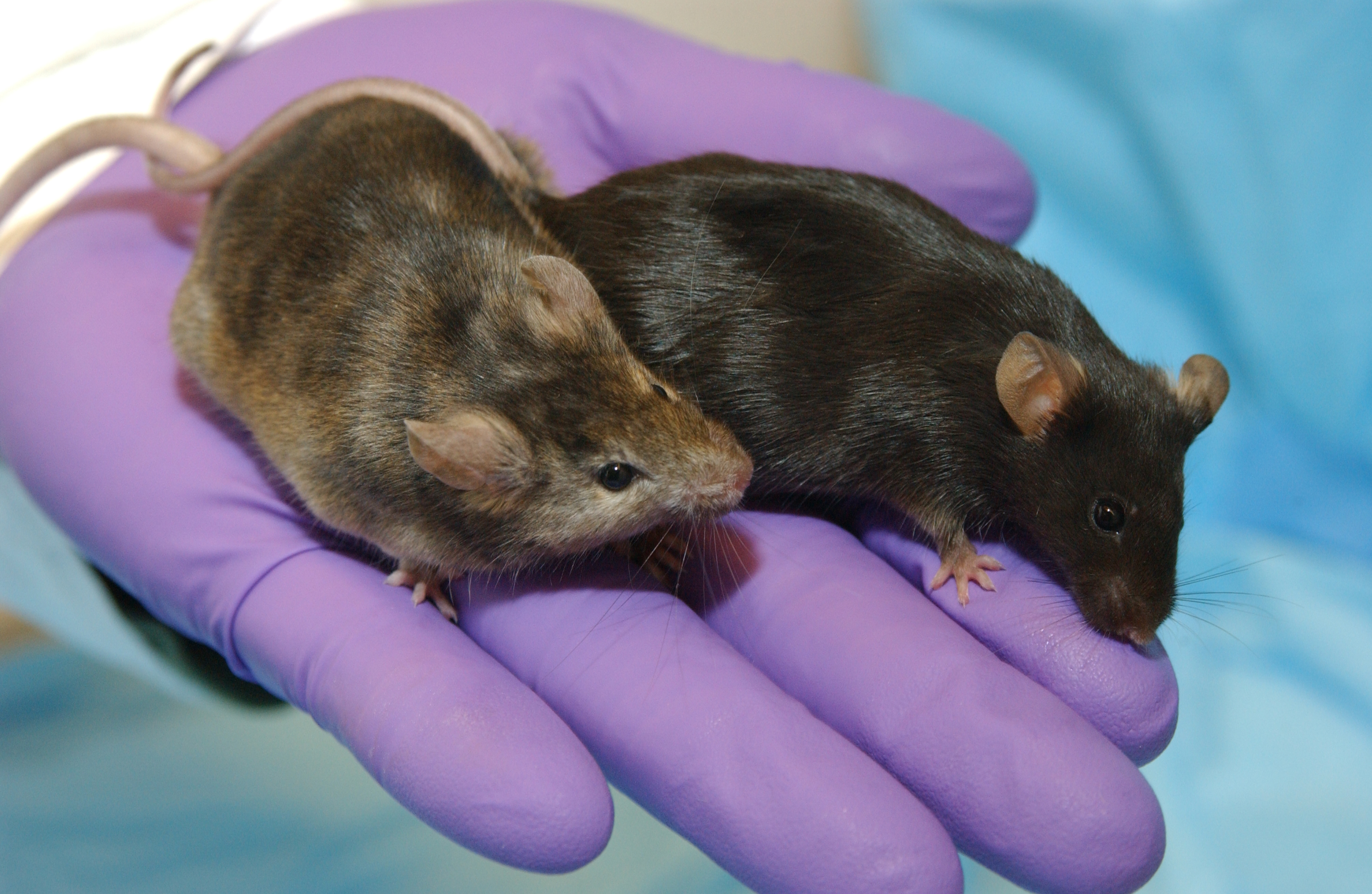
A laboratory mouse in which a gene affecting hair growth has been ablated (left), is shown next to a normal lab mouse

Genetic ablation occurs when a gene is deemed “null” through the homologous genetic recombination of a gene. It is utilized in the selective suppression of a specific cell line or cell type. This genetic engineering technique does not limit growth suppression to just the activity of an individual gene. Specific cell ablation enables the examination of the in vivo activity of cells. An example of this method in action can be seen through the production of a knockout mouse. This is accomplished through the administration of one or more transgenes into a fertilized mouse oocyte’s pronucleus. Afterwards, it is reimplanted into a host mother, who then births a transgenic mouse. The transgenic mouse carries one copy of the transgene3 out of several hundred. From these mice, a homozygous colony can be created through breeding.

== Historical development ==
In 1990, the gene knockout technique was just developing. There was a lack of information on the initial events that occur throughout the development of the vertebrate embryo. In order to form a better understanding, the instructions for making an entire set of DNA in a person or organism need be dissected, and the genes involved with this process need to be determined. Instructions for embryonic development may have some correlation to the lack of space shown by many genes in their expression patterns. A technique used to evaluate specific gene function is through the inactivation or removal of that gene. By eradicating a specific gene, its role in development of the embryonic expression pattern may be able to be observed.

== Clinical significance ==
The ability to selectively remove cells by ablation is monumental in the study of the development of eukaryotic biology, contributing greatly to the study of the origin, fate, or function of the cells. Genetic ablation occurs through the delivery of a toxin or death-inducing gene that is directed by a cell-specific enhancer (genetics), or by utilizing the GAL4/UAS system. Due to the array of known enhancers, toxins and death genes are able to be attached to nearly any cell selected, which permits cell-type-specificity. Through genetic ablation, the effects of removing every cell of a specific kind inside of an embryo are able to be observed; additionally, the entire population is able to be studied instead of just the individuals.

=== Advantages ===
Cell-type-specificity is a significant advantage of genetic ablation. The numerous enhancers that exist allow this specificity because toxins and death genes are able to target essentially any cell of choice. This cell specificity ablates all selected cell types in all sections of the embryo. This is an advantage because the number of analogous cells eliminated within a tissue has an influence on the phenotypic effects of ablation. Furthermore, because genetic ablation only requires organizing a genetic cross, it is simple technically, which allows a simultaneous examination of substantially sized populations of individuals. A larger number of samples helps authenticate the results, by providing more data to conclude from. Also, in certain cases, ablation is cell-autonomous, which eradicates any fear of compromising neighboring cells. This is seen in ricin-A and diphtheria-A chains as well as the death-inducing genes.

=== Disadvantages ===
There are also disadvantages associated with the genetic approaches to ablation. There is irregularity seen in expression that is driven by enhancers. These irregularities may be observed through a lack of restriction by a selected enhancer to a selected cell type or through a lack of inclusion for all cells of a certain kind in an embryo. Furthermore, the expressing cells can be killed by low levels of expression. A lack of choice of timing can prove to be a disadvantage as well. This is possible if the expression of the effector gene is GAL4- or enhancer-dependent. It is important to confirm that the toxin-encoding gene is only expressed during relevant developmental stages and in that specific cell in the embryo. This can be avoided by using mosaic expression.

== Technological implications ==
Temporal control of gene expression and ablation can be attributed to evolving transgenic and gene-therapy technologies. These technologies are enhanced by an understanding of the mechanisms that affect tissue-specific gene transcription. Genetic ablation allows for genes to be removed by compounds that are introduced into the organism of interest.

=== Genetic ablation in transgenic mice ===
Genetic ablation technology may be able to produce mice with mutations in just about every gene present in their germ line. Although this technique is not perfected, it contains the ability to target questions surrounding the molecular and cellular biology of embryonic growth. Furthermore, it may assist in the creation of animals to serve as guides showing the effects on human diseases including demyelination, dwarfism, and immunodeficiencies.

=== Genetic ablation in plant development ===
Genetic ablation is a remarkable component in the study of cell lineages in mammals. This known quality encourages further study in dissecting plant developmental processes. A comprehensive overview of the stages in development is observed through intentional cell death by the use of promotors specifically shown in various cell types, along with the ability to produce genetically-engineered plants. Because of the more specific technique used in the production of chimeric plants, coupled with laser ablation, genetic ablation serves as a principal mechanism for understanding plant cell development.
