= Major facilitator superfamily domain containing 14A =

Protein found in humans

SLC71A1

Identifiers
- Aliases: SLC71A1, HIAT1, major facilitator superfamily domain containing 14A
- External IDs: MGI: 1201609; GeneCards: SLC71A1

Gene location (Human)
Chr.	Chromosome 1 (human)
Band	1p21.2	Start	100,038,095 bp
Band	1p21.2	End	100,083,377 bp

Gene location (Mouse)
Chr.	Chromosome 3 (mouse)
Band	3|3 G1	Start	116,424,813 bp
Band	3|3 G1	End	116,456,326 bp
RNA expression pattern
Bgee	Human / Mouse (ortholog); Top expressed in: smooth muscle tissue; islet of Langerhans; endometrium; corpus callosum; monocyte; tibial arteries; gonad; right lung; placenta; C1 segment / Top expressed in: spermatocyte; spermatid; genital tubercle; parotid gland; seminal vesicula; Epithelium of choroid plexus; granulocyte; lacrimal gland; tail of embryo; retinal pigment epithelium; More reference expression data
BioGPS	n/a
Gene ontology
Molecular function	transporter activity
Cellular component	membrane; integral component of membrane
Biological process	transmembrane transport; acrosome assembly; spermatogenesis; spermatid development; spermatid nucleus differentiation; sperm mitochondrion organization
Sources:Amigo / QuickGO
Orthologs
Databases	NCBI: entry; OMA: entry
Species	Human	Mouse
Entrez	64645	15247
Ensembl	ENSG00000156875	ENSMUSG00000089911
UniProt	Q96MC6	P70187
RefSeq (mRNA)	NM_033055	NM_008246
RefSeq (protein)	NP_149044	NP_032272
Location (UCSC)	Chr 1: 100.04 – 100.08 Mb	Chr 3: 116.42 – 116.46 Mb
PubMed search
- Wikidata
View/Edit Human	View/Edit Mouse

Major facilitator superfamily domain containing 14A (MFSD14A, HIAT1) is a protein that in humans is encoded by the gene SLC71A1 (formerly MFSD14A). MFSD14A is an atypical solute carrier of MFS type. HGNC:23363

MFSD14A cluster to AMTF1, together with MFSD9, MFSD10 and MFSD14B.
