= Monocarboxylate transporter 11 =

SLC16A11

Identifiers
- Aliases: SLC16A11, MCT11, solute carrier family 16 member 11, MCT 11
- External IDs: OMIM: 615765; MGI: 2663709; GeneCards: SLC16A11

Gene location (Human)
Chr.	Chromosome 17 (human)
Band	17p13.1	Start	7,041,621 bp
Band	17p13.1	End	7,044,092 bp

Gene location (Mouse)
Chr.	Chromosome 11 (mouse)
Band	11|11 B3	Start	70,103,578 bp
Band	11|11 B3	End	70,107,243 bp
RNA expression pattern
Bgee	Human / Mouse (ortholog); Top expressed in: right uterine tube; right lobe of thyroid gland; left lobe of thyroid gland; olfactory zone of nasal mucosa; parotid gland; minor salivary glands; palpebral conjunctiva; skin of abdomen; skin of leg; right lobe of liver / Top expressed in: cerebellar cortex; right kidney; olfactory epithelium; motor neuron; superior frontal gyrus; trachea; primary visual cortex; conjunctival fornix; dentate gyrus of hippocampal formation granule cell; gastrula; More reference expression data
BioGPS	n/a
Gene ontology
Molecular function	symporter activity; monocarboxylic acid transmembrane transporter activity; protein binding; pyruvate transmembrane transporter activity
Cellular component	membrane; integral component of membrane; endoplasmic reticulum; endoplasmic reticulum membrane; integral component of plasma membrane; plasma membrane
Biological process	transmembrane transport; lipid metabolism; monocarboxylic acid transport; pyruvate transmembrane transport
Sources:Amigo / QuickGO
Orthologs
Databases	NCBI: entry; OMA: entry
Species	Human	Mouse
Entrez	162515	216867
Ensembl	ENSG00000174326	ENSMUSG00000040938
UniProt	Q8NCK7	Q5NC32
RefSeq (mRNA)	NM_153357; NM_001370549; NM_001370553	NM_001114970; NM_001114971; NM_153081
RefSeq (protein)	NP_699188; NP_001357478; NP_001357482	NP_694721
Location (UCSC)	Chr 17: 7.04 – 7.04 Mb	Chr 11: 70.1 – 70.11 Mb
PubMed search
- Wikidata
View/Edit Human	View/Edit Mouse

Monocarboxylate transporter 11 (MCT 11) is a protein that in humans is encode by the SLC16A11 gene.

Variants in this gene are associated with increased body-mass index and type 2 diabetes.
