= SLC61A1 =

Protein-coding gene in humans

Identifiers
- Aliases: SLC61A1, hsMOT2, major facilitator superfamily domain containing 5, MFSD5, Solute carrier family 61 member 1
- External IDs: MGI: 2145901; GeneCards: SLC61A1

Gene location (Human)
Chr.	Chromosome 12 (human)
Band	12q13.13	Start	53,251,251 bp
Band	12q13.13	End	53,254,406 bp

Gene location (Mouse)
Chr.	Chromosome 15 (mouse)
Band	15|15 F2	Start	102,187,889 bp
Band	15|15 F2	End	102,190,189 bp
RNA expression pattern
Bgee	Human / Mouse (ortholog); Top expressed in: skin of leg; skin of abdomen; mucosa of transverse colon; right adrenal cortex; granulocyte; left adrenal gland; left adrenal cortex; gums; gingival epithelium; apex of heart / Top expressed in: lip; stroma of bone marrow; transitional epithelium of urinary bladder; esophagus; right kidney; skin of external ear; calvaria; yolk sac; choroid plexus of fourth ventricle; granulocyte; More reference expression data
BioGPS	n/a
Gene ontology
Molecular function	protein binding; molybdate ion transmembrane transporter activity
Cellular component	integral component of membrane; plasma membrane; membrane
Biological process	molybdate ion transport; ion transport; transport
Sources:Amigo / QuickGO
Orthologs
Databases	NCBI: entry; OMA: entry
Species	Human	Mouse
Entrez	84975	106073
Ensembl	ENSG00000182544	ENSMUSG00000045665
UniProt	Q6N075	Q921Y4
RefSeq (mRNA)	NM_001170790; NM_032889	NM_134100
RefSeq (protein)	NP_001164261; NP_116278	NP_598861
Location (UCSC)	Chr 12: 53.25 – 53.25 Mb	Chr 15: 102.19 – 102.19 Mb
PubMed search
- Wikidata
View/Edit Human	View/Edit Mouse

Solute carrier family 61 member 1 is a protein that in humans is encoded by the SLC61A1 gene (previously MFSD4). This protein is responsible for molybdenum uptake instead of the cell. It has previously been described as an atypical SLC, and it is expressed in neuronal plasma membrane. It is a plausible Solute carrier transporter. It transports molybdate anions, and it interacts with GLP-1R. In humans, it is encoded by the gene SLC61A1.

SLC61A1/MFSD5 belongs to AMTF6.
