= SPNS2 =

Protein-coding gene in the species Homo sapiens

Identifiers
- Aliases: SPNS2, sphingolipid transporter 2, SLC62A2, DFNB115, SLC63A2
- External IDs: OMIM: 612584; MGI: 2384936; GeneCards: SPNS2

Gene location (Human)
Chr.	Chromosome 17 (human)
Band	17p13.2	Start	4,498,881 bp
Band	17p13.2	End	4,539,035 bp

Gene location (Mouse)
Chr.	Chromosome 11 (mouse)
Band	11|11 B4	Start	72,342,464 bp
Band	11|11 B4	End	72,380,730 bp
RNA expression pattern
Bgee	Human / Mouse (ortholog); Top expressed in: mucosa of pharynx; C1 segment; skin of arm; buccal mucosa cell; renal medulla; right lung; inferior ganglion of vagus nerve; right frontal lobe; upper lobe of left lung; Brodmann area 9 / Top expressed in: esophagus; lip; muscle of thigh; triceps brachii muscle; gastrocnemius muscle; sternocleidomastoid muscle; temporal muscle; knee joint; mesenteric lymph nodes; medial head of gastrocnemius muscle; More reference expression data
BioGPS	n/a
Gene ontology
Molecular function	sphingolipid transporter activity
Cellular component	integral component of membrane; vesicle; lysosomal membrane; membrane
Biological process	lymphocyte homeostasis; regulation of humoral immune response; regulation of eye pigmentation; lipid transport; lymph node development; B cell homeostasis; bone development; lymphocyte migration; locomotion; transmembrane transport; sphingosine-1-phosphate receptor signaling pathway; sphingolipid metabolic process; T cell homeostasis
Sources:Amigo / QuickGO
Orthologs
Databases	NCBI: entry; OMA: entry
Species	Human	Mouse
Entrez	124976	216892
Ensembl	ENSG00000183018	ENSMUSG00000040447
UniProt	Q8IVW8	Q91VM4
RefSeq (mRNA)	NM_001124758	NM_001276383; NM_153060
RefSeq (protein)	NP_001118230	NP_001263312; NP_694700
Location (UCSC)	Chr 17: 4.5 – 4.54 Mb	Chr 11: 72.34 – 72.38 Mb
PubMed search
- Wikidata
View/Edit Human	View/Edit Mouse

Spinster homolog 2 (Drosophila) is a protein that in humans is encoded by the SPNS2 gene.

== Model organisms ==
The orthologous protein in zebrafish has been shown to transport sphingosine-1-phosphate (S1P) out of cells during vascular development, and human SPNS2 can transport S1P analogues, including the immunomodulating drug FTY720-P.
