= SLC67A2 =

Protein-coding gene in humans

Identifiers
- Aliases: SLC67A2, major facilitator superfamily domain containing 9, Solute carrier family 67 member 2, MFSD9
- External IDs: MGI: 2443548; GeneCards: SLC67A2

Gene location (Human)
Chr.	Chromosome 2 (human)
Band	2q12.1	Start	102,714,630 bp
Band	2q12.1	End	102,736,888 bp

Gene location (Mouse)
Chr.	Chromosome 1 (mouse)
Band	1|1 B	Start	40,811,198 bp
Band	1|1 B	End	40,829,847 bp
RNA expression pattern
Bgee	Human / Mouse (ortholog); Top expressed in: tendon of biceps brachii; mucosa of transverse colon; body of pancreas; rectum; paraflocculus of cerebellum; jejunal mucosa; right lobe of liver; bone marrow cell; duodenum; endothelial cell / Top expressed in: secondary oocyte; jejunum; primary oocyte; proximal tubule; lumbar spinal ganglion; right kidney; prostate; ileum; human kidney; large intestine; More reference expression data
BioGPS	n/a
Gene ontology
Molecular function	transporter activity
Cellular component	membrane; integral component of membrane
Biological process	transmembrane transport
Sources:Amigo / QuickGO
Orthologs
Databases	NCBI: entry; OMA: entry
Species	Human	Mouse
Entrez	84804	211798
Ensembl	ENSG00000135953	ENSMUSG00000041945
UniProt	Q8NBP5	Q8C0T7
RefSeq (mRNA)	NM_032718; NM_001322080; NM_001322081	NM_172499
RefSeq (protein)	NP_001309009; NP_001309010; NP_116107	NP_766087
Location (UCSC)	Chr 2: 102.71 – 102.74 Mb	Chr 1: 40.81 – 40.83 Mb
PubMed search
- Wikidata
View/Edit Human	View/Edit Mouse

Solute carrier family 67 member A2 is a protein that in humans is encoded by the SLC67A2 gene (previously MFSD9). It is a potential solute carrier, and called atypical solute carrier. It is expressed both in central and peripheral organs.
