= SV2B =

Protein-coding gene in humans

Identifiers
- Aliases: SV2B, HsT19680, synaptic vesicle glycoprotein 2B
- External IDs: OMIM: 185861; MGI: 1927338; GeneCards: SV2B

Gene location (Human)
Chr.	Chromosome 15 (human)
Band	15q26.1	Start	91,099,950 bp
Band	15q26.1	End	91,302,565 bp

Gene location (Mouse)
Chr.	Chromosome 7 (mouse)
Band	7|7 D1	Start	74,764,642 bp
Band	7|7 D1	End	74,959,010 bp
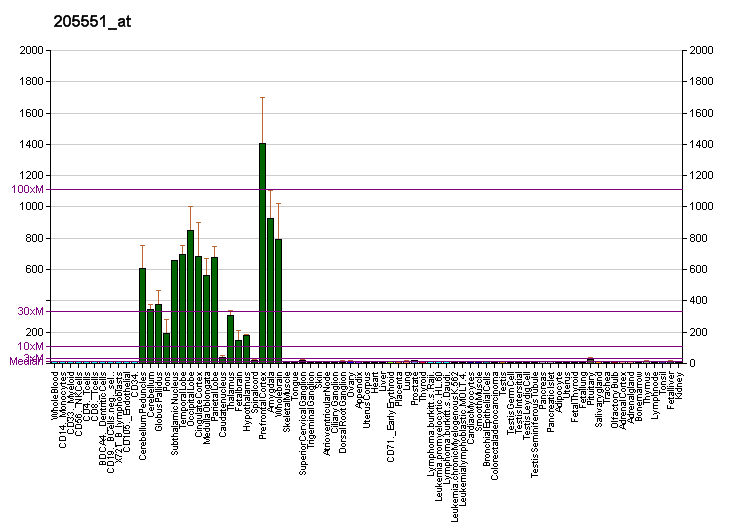
RNA expression pattern
Bgee	Human / Mouse (ortholog); Top expressed in: middle temporal gyrus; Brodmann area 10; Brodmann area 23; frontal pole; Brodmann area 46; orbitofrontal cortex; paraflocculus of cerebellum; superior frontal gyrus; pons; postcentral gyrus / Top expressed in: subiculum; piriform cortex; prefrontal cortex; primary motor cortex; dentate gyrus of hippocampal formation granule cell; temporal lobe; amygdala; cingulate gyrus; hippocampus proper; superior frontal gyrus; More reference expression data
BioGPS	More reference expression data
Gene ontology
Molecular function	protein binding; transmembrane transporter activity; transporter activity
Cellular component	cell junction; plasma membrane; synapse; acrosomal vesicle; membrane; cytoplasmic vesicle; synaptic vesicle; integral component of membrane; synaptic vesicle membrane; neuron projection
Biological process	neurotransmitter transport; transmembrane transport; chemical synaptic transmission
Sources:Amigo / QuickGO
Orthologs
Databases	NCBI: entry; OMA: entry
Species	Human	Mouse
Entrez	9899	64176
Ensembl	ENSG00000185518	ENSMUSG00000053025
UniProt	Q7L1I2	Q8BG39
RefSeq (mRNA)	NM_001167580; NM_014848; NM_001323031; NM_001323032; NM_001323033 NM_001323034; NM_001323036; NM_001323037; NM_001323038; NM_001323039; NM_001323040	NM_001109753; NM_153579; NM_001360571; NM_001360572; NM_001360573 NM_001360574; NM_001360575
RefSeq (protein)	NP_001161052; NP_001309960; NP_001309961; NP_001309962; NP_001309963 NP_001309965; NP_001309966; NP_001309967; NP_001309968; NP_001309969; NP_055663	NP_001103223; NP_705807; NP_001347500; NP_001347501; NP_001347502 NP_001347503; NP_001347504
Location (UCSC)	Chr 15: 91.1 – 91.3 Mb	Chr 7: 74.76 – 74.96 Mb
PubMed search
- Wikidata
View/Edit Human	View/Edit Mouse

Synaptic vesicle glycoprotein 2B is a protein that in humans is encoded by the SV2B gene.

== See also ==
- SV2A
