= UNC93B1 =

Protein-coding gene in the species Homo sapiens

Identifiers
- Aliases: UNC93B1, IIAE1, UNC93, UNC93B, Unc-93B1, unc-93 homolog B1 (C. elegans), unc-93 homolog B1, TLR signaling regulator
- External IDs: OMIM: 608204; MGI: 1859307; GeneCards: UNC93B1

Gene location (Human)
Chr.	Chromosome 11 (human)
Band	11q13.2	Start	67,991,100 bp
Band	11q13.2	End	68,004,982 bp

Gene location (Mouse)
Chr.	Chromosome 19 (mouse)
Band	19|19 A	Start	3,985,186 bp
Band	19|19 A	End	3,999,340 bp
RNA expression pattern
Bgee	Human / Mouse (ortholog); Top expressed in: granulocyte; monocyte; olfactory zone of nasal mucosa; spleen; bone marrow cell; appendix; right lung; right uterine tube; upper lobe of left lung; minor salivary glands / Top expressed in: granulocyte; stroma of bone marrow; mesenteric lymph nodes; spleen; tibiofemoral joint; calvaria; ankle joint; ankle; submandibular gland; subcutaneous adipose tissue; More reference expression data
BioGPS	n/a
Gene ontology
Molecular function	Toll-like receptor binding
Cellular component	integral component of membrane; early phagosome; Golgi membrane; endosome; lysosome; phagocytic vesicle; endoplasmic reticulum membrane; endoplasmic reticulum; membrane; cytoplasmic vesicle
Biological process	toll-like receptor 9 signaling pathway; intracellular protein transport; toll-like receptor 3 signaling pathway; adaptive immune response; defense response to virus; toll-like receptor 7 signaling pathway; toll-like receptor signaling pathway; immune system process; innate immune response
Sources:Amigo / QuickGO
Orthologs
Databases	NCBI: entry; OMA: entry
Species	Human	Mouse
Entrez	81622	54445
Ensembl	ENSG00000110057	ENSMUSG00000036908
UniProt	Q9H1C4	Q8VCW4
RefSeq (mRNA)	NM_030930	NM_001161428; NM_019449
RefSeq (protein)	NP_112192	NP_001154900; NP_062322
Location (UCSC)	Chr 11: 67.99 – 68 Mb	Chr 19: 3.99 – 4 Mb
PubMed search
- Wikidata
View/Edit Human	View/Edit Mouse

Unc-93 homolog B1 (C. elegans), also known as UNC93B1, is a protein which in humans is encoded by the UNC93B1 gene.

== Function ==
This gene encodes a protein with similarity to the Caenorhabditis elegans unc93 protein. The Unc93 protein is involved in the regulation or coordination of muscle contraction in the worm.

In humans, UNC93B1 is involved in interferon production. Mutations in UNC93B1 have been associated with an innate immune defect that increases susceptibility to encephalitis caused by herpes simplex virus.
