= Amino acid permease =

Membrane permease

Identifiers
- Symbol: AA_permease
- Pfam: PF13520
- Pfam clan: CL0062
- InterPro: IPR004841
- PROSITE: PDOC00191
- TCDB: 2.A.3
- OPM superfamily: 64
- OPM protein: 3gia
Available protein structures:
- PDB: IPR004841 PF13520 (ECOD; PDBsum)
- AlphaFold: IPR004841; PF13520

Amino acid permeases are membrane permeases involved in the transport of amino acids into the cell. A number of such proteins have been found to be evolutionary related. These proteins contain 12 transmembrane segments.

== See also ==
- Amino acid transporter

== Human proteins containing this domain ==
CIP1; SLC12A1; SLC12A2; SLC12A3; SLC12A4; SLC12A5; SLC12A6; SLC12A7; SLC12A8; SLC12A9; SLC7A1; SLC7A10; SLC7A11; SLC7A13; SLC7A14; SLC7A2; SLC7A3; SLC7A4; SLC7A5; SLC7A6; SLC7A7; SLC7A8; SLC7A9;
