= Electroneutral cation-Cl =

K-Cl Co-transporter type 1 (KCC1)

Identifiers
- Symbol: KCl_Cotrans_1
- Pfam: PF03522
- InterPro: IPR018491
- TCDB: 2.A.30
Available protein structures:
- PDB: IPR018491 PF03522 (ECOD; PDBsum)
- AlphaFold: IPR018491; PF03522

In molecular biology, the electroneutral cation-Cl (electroneutral potassium chloride cotransporter) family of proteins are a family of solute carrier proteins. This family includes the products of the Human genes: SLC12A1, SLC12A1, SLC12A2, SLC12A3, SLC12A4, SLC12A5, SLC12A6, SLC12A7, SLC12A8 and SLC12A9.

The K-Cl co-transporter (KCC) mediates the coupled movement of K^{+} and Cl^{−} ions across the plasma membrane of many animal cells. This transport is involved in the regulatory volume decrease in response to cell swelling in red blood cells, and has been proposed to play a role in the vectorial movement of Cl^{−} across kidney epithelia. The transport process involves one for one electroneutral movement of K^{+} together with Cl^{−}, and, in all known mammalian cells, the net movement is outward.

The neuronal KCC subtype KCC2 is cell-volume insensitive and plays a unique role in maintaining low intracellular Cl^{−}concentration, which is required in neurones for the functioning of Cl^{−} dependent fast synaptic inhibition, mediated by certain neurotransmitters, such as gamma-aminobutyric acid (GABA) and glycine.

Three isoforms of the K-Cl co-transporter have been described, termed KCC1 (SLC12A4), KCC2 (SLC12A5), and KCC3 (SLC12A6), containing 1085, 1116 and 1150 amino acids, respectively. They are predicted to have 12 transmembrane (TM) regions in a central hydrophobic domain, together with hydrophilic N- and C-termini that are likely cytoplasmic. Comparison of their sequences with those of other ion-transporting membrane proteins reveals that they are part of a new superfamily of cation-chloride co-transporters, which includes the Na-Cl and Na-K-2Cl co-transporters. KCC1 and KCC3 are widely expressed in human tissues, while KCC2 is expressed only in brain neurons, making it likely that this is the isoform responsible for maintaining low Cl^{−} concentration in neurons. A study in the model organism C. elegans found that the KCC3 ortholog functions in glial cells to regulate animal behavior.

KCC1 is widely expressed in human tissues, and when heterologously expressed, possesses the functional characteristics of the well-studied red blood cell K-Cl co-transporter, including stimulation by both swelling and N-ethylmaleimide. Several splice variants have also been identified.

KCC3 is widely expressed in human tissues and, like KCC1, is stimulated by both swelling and N-ethylmaleimide. The induction of KCC3 is up-regulated by vascular endothelial growth factor and down-regulated by tumour necrosis factor. Defects in KCC3 are linked to agenesis of the corpus callosum with peripheral neuropathy. This disorder is characterised by severe progressive sensorimotor neuropathy, mental retardation, dysmorphic features and complete or partial agenesis of the corpus callosum.
