= Heterodimeric amino-acid transporter =

Family of transport proteins

Heterodimeric amino-acid transporters are a family of transport proteins that facilitate the transport of certain amino acids across cell membranes. Each comprises a light and a heavy protein subunit. Transport activity happens in the light.

The following table lists the members of this family:

Transport system	Light subunit	Heavy subunit	Tissue distribution	Substrates	Affinity	Sodium dependence	Disease linkage
L	LAT1 (SLC7A5)	4F2hc (SLC3A2)	kidney, liver, intestine, brain, heart lung, blood–brain barrier	large neutral amino acids, thyroid hormones	micromolar	no	–
L	LAT2 (SLC7A8)	4F2hc (SLC3A2)	kidney, intestine, brain, liver, muscle, heart, lung	smaller neutral amino acids	millimolar	no	–
y^{+}L	y^{+}LAT1 (SLC7A7)	4F2hc (SLC3A2)	kidney, intestine, lung, erythrocytes, leukocytes	large neutral amino acids, dibasic amino acid exchange	micromolar	yes	Lysinuric protein intolerance
y^{+}L	y^{+}LAT2 (SLC7A6)	4F2hc (SLC3A2)	brain, intestine, heart, kidney, lung, liver	neutral amino acids, dibasic amino acid exchange, glutamine/arginine exchange	millimolar	yes	–
x_{c}^{−}	xCT (SLC7A11)	4F2hc (SLC3A2)	macrophages, liver, kidney, brain	glutamine/cystine exchange		no	–
asc	ascAT1 (SLC7A10)	4F2hc (SLC3A2)	brain, lung, small intestine, kidney	small neutral amino acids		no	–
b^{0,+}	b^{0,+}AT1 (SLC7A9)	rBAT (SLC3A1)	kidney, intestine, brain	neutral/dibasic amino acids		no	Cystinuria type I
