= SLC3A2 =

Protein found in humans

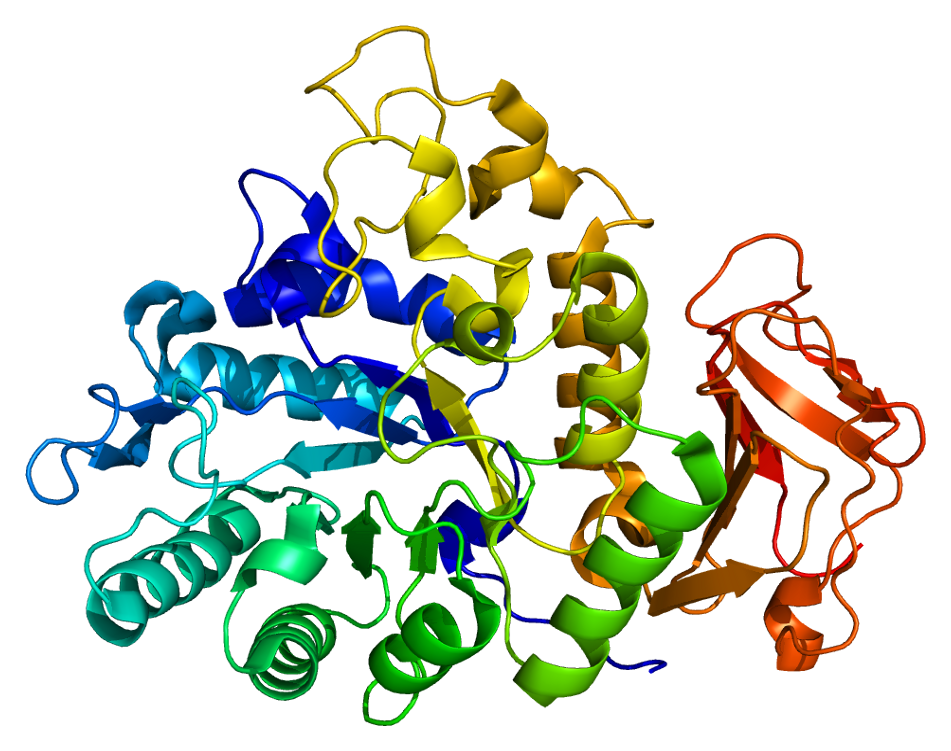

Identifiers
- Aliases: SLC3A2, 4F2, 4F2HC, 4T2HC, CD98, CD98HC, MDU1, NACAE, solute carrier family 3 member 2
- External IDs: OMIM: 158070; MGI: 96955; GeneCards: SLC3A2
Available structures
PDB	Ortholog search: PDBe RCSB
PDB	List of PDB id codes 2DH2, 2DH3

Gene location (Human)
Chr.	Chromosome 11 (human)
Band	11q12.3	Start	62,856,004 bp
Band	11q12.3	End	62,888,880 bp

Gene location (Mouse)
Chr.	Chromosome 19 (mouse)
Band	19 A|19 5.44 cM	Start	8,684,246 bp
Band	19 A|19 5.44 cM	End	8,700,733 bp
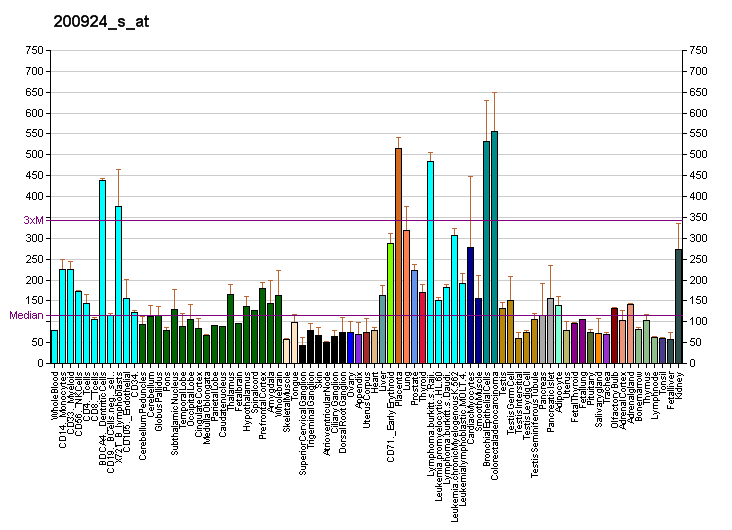
RNA expression pattern
Bgee	Human / Mouse (ortholog); Top expressed in: islet of Langerhans; ventricular zone; stromal cell of endometrium; right lobe of thyroid gland; left lobe of thyroid gland; ganglionic eminence; upper lobe of left lung; skin of abdomen; canal of the cervix; skin of leg / Top expressed in: epithelium of lens; choroid plexus of fourth ventricle; submandibular gland; parotid gland; calvaria; spermatocyte; stroma of bone marrow; right kidney; neural layer of retina; lip; More reference expression data
BioGPS	More reference expression data
Gene ontology
Molecular function	calcium:sodium antiporter activity; neutral amino acid transmembrane transporter activity; catalytic activity; protein binding; double-stranded RNA binding; RNA binding; cadherin binding
Cellular component	integral component of membrane; membrane; melanosome; plasma membrane; cell surface; apical plasma membrane; extracellular exosome; nucleus; cytosol
Biological process	response to exogenous dsRNA; cell growth; amino acid transport; leukocyte migration; calcium ion transport; tryptophan transport; sodium ion transmembrane transport; L-alpha-amino acid transmembrane transport; transport; carbohydrate metabolic process; L-leucine import across plasma membrane
Sources:Amigo / QuickGO
Orthologs
Databases	NCBI: entry; OMA: entry
Species	Human	Mouse
Entrez	6520	17254
Ensembl	ENSG00000168003	ENSMUSG00000010095
UniProt	P08195	P10852
RefSeq (mRNA)	NM_001012661; NM_001012662; NM_001012663; NM_001012664; NM_001013251 NM_002394	NM_001161413; NM_008577
RefSeq (protein)	NP_001012680; NP_001012682; NP_001013269; NP_002385	NP_001154885; NP_032603
Location (UCSC)	Chr 11: 62.86 – 62.89 Mb	Chr 19: 8.68 – 8.7 Mb
PubMed search
- Wikidata
View/Edit Human	View/Edit Mouse

SLC3A2, also known as 4F2 cell-surface antigen heavy chain is a protein that in humans is encoded by the SLC3A2 (solute carrier family 3 member 2) gene.

SLC3A2 comprises the heavy subunit of the large neutral amino acid transporter (LAT1) that is also known as CD98 (cluster of differentiation 98).

== Function ==
SLC3A2 is a member of the solute carrier family and encodes a cell surface, transmembrane protein with an alpha-amylase domain. The protein exists as the heavy chain of a heterodimer, covalently bound through di-sulfide bonds to one of several possible light chains. It associates with integrins and mediates integrin-dependent signaling related to normal cell growth and tumorigenesis. Alternate transcriptional splice variants, encoding different isoforms, have been characterized.

LAT1 is a heterodimeric membrane transport protein that preferentially transports neutral branched (valine, leucine, isoleucine) and aromatic (tryptophan, tyrosine, phenylalanine) amino acids. LAT is highly expressed in brain capillaries (which form the blood brain barrier) relative to other tissues.

A functional LAT1 transporter is composed of two proteins encoded by two distinct genes:

- 4F2hc/CD98 heavy subunit protein encoded by the SLC3A2 gene (this gene)
- CD98 light subunit protein encoded by the SLC7A5 gene

== Interactions ==
SLC3A2 has been shown to interact with SLC7A7.

Additionally, SLC3A2 is a constituent member of the system xc- cystine/glutamate antiporter, complexing with SLC7A11.

== See also ==
- Heterodimeric amino acid transporter
