= BMS-466442 =

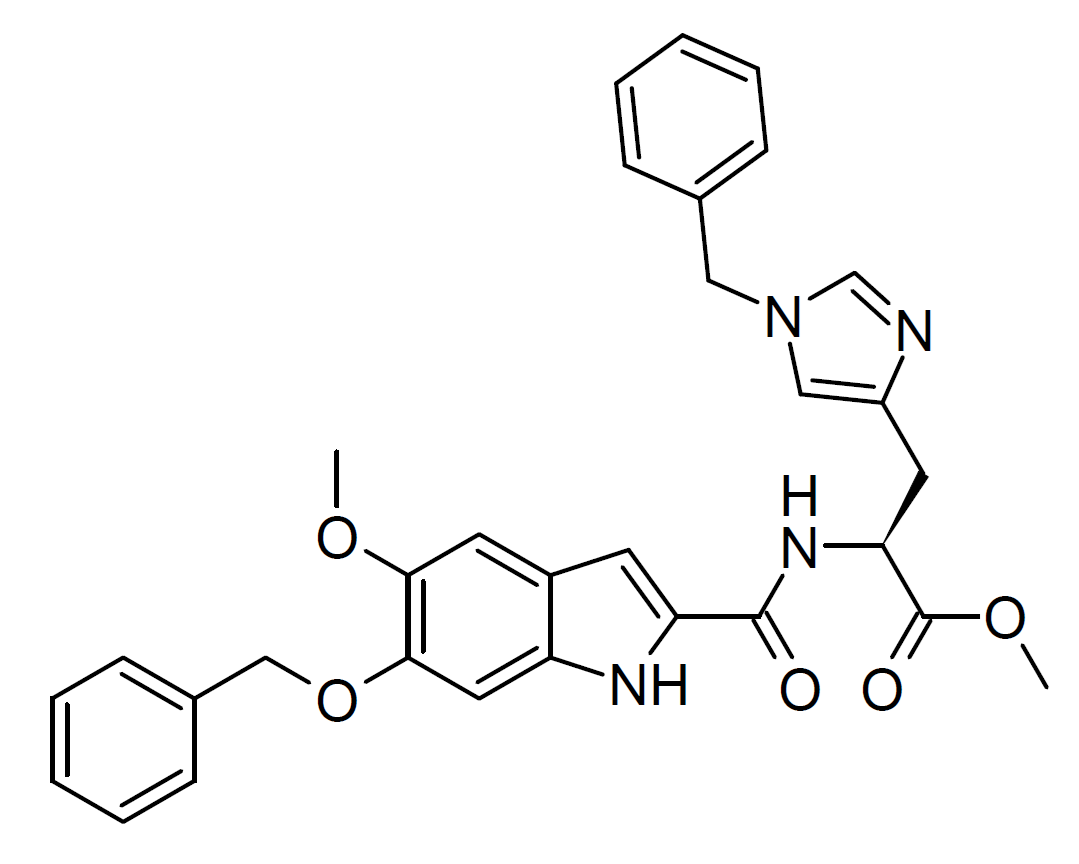

Identifiers
- IUPAC name: methyl (2S)-3-(1-benzylimidazol-4-yl)-2-[(5-methoxy-6-phenylmethoxy-1H-indole-2-carbonyl)amino]propanoate
- CAS Number: 1598424-76-0
- PubChem CID: 124082063
- ChemSpider: 57582778

Chemical and physical data
- Formula: C_{31}H_{30}N_{4}O_{5}
- Molar mass: 538.604 g·mol^{−1}
- 3D model (JSmol): Interactive image
- SMILES: COC1=C(C=C2C(=C1)C=C(N2)C(=O)N[C@@H](CC3=CN(C=N3)CC4=CC=CC=C4)C(=O)OC)OCC5=CC=CC=C5
- InChI: InChI=1S/C31H30N4O5/c1-38-28-14-23-13-26(33-25(23)16-29(28)40-19-22-11-7-4-8-12-22)30(36)34-27(31(37)39-2)15-24-18-35(20-32-24)17-21-9-5-3-6-10-21/h3-14,16,18,20,27,33H,15,17,19H2,1-2H3,(H,34,36)/t27-/m0/s1; Key:UUCAHZCMRZOTNF-MHZLTWQESA-N

BMS-466442 is an experimental drug that acts as a selective inhibitor of the amino acid transporter alanine serine cysteine transporter-1 (ASC-1). It indirectly increases activation of the NMDA receptor by boosting intracellular levels of the endogenous ligands glycine and D-serine. It was developed as a potential treatment for schizophrenia.
