= CD98 =

Family of protein complexes

solute carrier family 3 member 2 (activators of dibasic and neutral amino acid transport)

Identifiers
- Symbol: SLC3A2
- Alt. symbols: MDU1, 4T2HC, 4F2, NACAE, CD98
- NCBI gene: 6520
- HGNC: 11026
- OMIM: 158070
- RefSeq: NM_001013251
- UniProt: P08195

Other data
- Locus: Chr. 11 q12-q22
Search for
- Structures: Swiss-model
- Domains: InterPro

solute carrier family 7 member 5 (cationic amino acid transporter, y+ system)

Identifiers
- Symbol: SLC7A5
- Alt. symbols: LAT1, E16, D16S469E, MPE16, CD98
- NCBI gene: 8140
- HGNC: 11063
- OMIM: 600182
- RefSeq: NM_003486
- UniProt: Q01650

Other data
- Locus: Chr. 16 q24.3
Search for
- Structures: Swiss-model
- Domains: InterPro

CD98 is a glycoprotein that is a heterodimer composed of SLC3A2 and SLC7A5 that forms the large neutral amino acid transporter (LAT1). LAT1 is a heterodimeric membrane transport protein that preferentially transports branched-chain (valine, leucine, isoleucine) and aromatic (tryptophan, tyrosine, phenylalanine) amino acids. LAT is highly expressed in brain capillaries (which form the blood–brain barrier) relative to other tissues.

A functional LAT1 transporter is composed of two proteins encoded by two distinct genes:

- 4F2hc/CD98 heavy subunit protein encoded by the SLC3A2 gene
- CD98 light subunit protein encoded by the SLC7A5 gene

== See also ==
- Cluster of differentiation
- Transmembrane protein
- Transport protein
- Solute carrier family
