= International Cystinuria Foundation =

Nonprofit organization

The International Cystinuria Foundation (ICF) is a Colorado-based nonprofit organization that offers educational resources to individuals affected by cystinuria. Its mission is to enhance, educate, and promote the overall well-being of the cystinuric community. The ICF serves an international audience through its website and hosts a large community where individuals with cystinuria, parents of cystinuric children, and physicians can share experiences and information for educational and supportive purposes.

== History ==
The website www.cystinuria.org was founded on October 17, 2002 and was opened to the public later that month. The initial site featured the first version of the Cystinuria.org community forum as well as a dictionary to aid interested readers in understanding cystinuria-relevant scientific literature. In mid November, the first learning tutorial was published, providing readers with a basic understanding of amino acid structure and function with an emphasis on cysteine and cystine. More tutorials were added covering the relevant topics of stone formation, stone prevention, and antibiotic use (for patients with recurring infections). The development of educational tutorials continued into early 2004, when the site became the online home of the newly incorporated Cystinuria Foundation of America (CysFA). On August 8, 2005, following the successful organization of the first Cystinuria Sympoiusm, CysFA was dissolved and the International Cystinuria Foundation was incorporated in its place to reflect the goal of reaching out to affected individuals worldwide. On March 30, 2006, the ICF was awarded 501(c)(3) tax-exempt status by the Internal Revenue Service (IRS), and classified as a public charity.

== Symposia ==
A main goal of the ICF is to hold annual symposia where top experts in the cystinuria-related fields of urology, nephrology, genetics, and psychological health present educational information and cutting-edge research findings to general members of the cystinuric community. To date, the ICF has held three such symposia, two in New York City and one in Chicago.
