= N-Ethylmaleimide =

Organic compound derived from maleic acid

Names
- Preferred IUPAC name 1-Ethyl-1H-pyrrole-2,5-dione
- Other names Ethylmaleimide

Identifiers
CAS Number	128-53-0
3D model (JSmol)	Interactive image
Abbreviations	NEM
Beilstein Reference	112448
ChEBI	CHEBI:44485
ChEMBL	ChEMBL8211
ChemSpider	4209
DrugBank	DB02967
ECHA InfoCard	100.004.449
EC Number	204-892-4
Gmelin Reference	405614
IUPHAR/BPS	5335
KEGG	C02441
PubChem CID	4362
UNII	O3C74ACM9V
CompTox Dashboard (EPA)	DTXSID1059573
- InChI: InChI=1S/C6H7NO2/c1-2-7-5(8)3-4-6(7)9/h3-4H,2H2,1H3 Key: HDFGOPSGAURCEO-UHFFFAOYSA-N; InChI=1/C6H7NO2/c1-2-7-5(8)3-4-6(7)9/h3-4H,2H2,1H3 Key: HDFGOPSGAURCEO-UHFFFAOYAE
- SMILES: O=C1\C=C/C(=O)N1CC

Properties
Chemical formula	C_{6}H_{7}NO_{2}
Molar mass	125.12528
Melting point	43 to 46 °C (109 to 115 °F; 316 to 319 K)
Boiling point	210 °C (410 °F; 483 K)

Hazards
- GHS labelling
Pictograms	(GHS05: Corrosive) (GHS06: Toxic) (GHS07: Exclamation mark)
Signal word	Danger
Hazard statements	H300, H301, H311, H314, H317
Precautionary statements	P260, P264, P270, P272, P280, P301+P310, P301+P330+P331, P302+P352, P303+P361+P353, P304+P340, P305+P351+P338, P310, P312, P321, P322, P330, P333+P313, P361, P363, P405, P501
- Except where otherwise noted, data are given for materials in their standard state (at 25 °C [77 °F], 100 kPa). verify (what is ?) Infobox references

N-Ethylmaleimide (NEM) is an organic compound that is derived from maleic acid. It is an unstable substance that reacts rapidly with thiols and is commonly used to modify cysteine residues in proteins and peptides.

== Organic chemistry ==
NEM is a Michael acceptor in the Michael reaction, which means that it adds into nucleophiles such as thiols. The resulting thioether features is a strong C–S bond and the reaction is virtually irreversible. Reaction with thiols occur in the pH range 6.5–7.5, NEM may react with amines or undergo hydrolysis at a more alkaline pH. NEM has been widely used to probe the functional role of thiol groups in enzymology. NEM is an irreversible inhibitor of all cysteine peptidases, with alkylation occurring at the active site thiol group (see schematic).

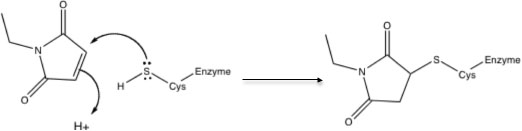
Mechanism of irreversible inhibition of a cysteine peptidase with NEM.

== Case studies ==
NEM blocks vesicular transport. In lysis buffers, 20 to 25 mM of NEM is used to inhibit de-sumoylation of proteins for Western Blot analysis. NEM has also been used as an inhibitor of deubiquitinases.

N-Ethylmaleimide was used by Arthur Kornberg and colleagues to knock out DNA polymerase III in order to compare its activity to that of DNA polymerase I (pol III and I, respectively). Kornberg had been awarded the Nobel Prize for discovering pol I, then believed to be the mechanism of bacterial DNA replication, although in this experiment he showed that pol III was the actual replicative machinery.

NEM activates ouabain-insensitive Cl-dependent K efflux in low-K sheep and goat red blood cells. This discovery contributed to the molecular identification of K–Cl cotransport (KCC) in human embryonic cells transfected by KCC1 isoform cDNA, 16 years later. Since then, NEM has been widely used as a diagnostic tool to uncover or manipulate the membrane presence of K–Cl cotransport in cells of many species in the animal kingdom. Despite repeated unsuccessful attempts to identify chemically the target thiol group, at physiological pH, NEM may form adducts with thiols within protein kinases that phosphorylate KCC at specific serine and threonine residues primarily within the C-terminal domain of the transporter. The ensuing dephosphorylation of KCC by protein phosphatases leads to activation of KCC.
