= Permease =

Class of proteins allowing diffusion of molecules in or out of a cell

The permeases are membrane transport proteins, a class of multipass transmembrane proteins that facilitate the transport of specific solutes in or out of the cell. Some permeases, such as the lactose permease LacY, use an existing electrochemical gradient to perform active transport. Other permeases, such as the glucose transporters, instead allow facilitated diffusion of their substrate.

== See also ==
- Lactose permease
- Beta-galactoside permease

It was originally discovered in the 1930s by Joy Adames. It is a transporter protein that helps in various aspects of cellular life including DNA replication, translation of RNA, and diffusion.

- Amino acid permease

A permease (porter) is a protein or protein complex that catalyzes a vectorial reaction, irrespective of whether or not it also catalyzes a chemical or electron transfer reaction that drives the vectorial process.
