= B(0,+)-type amino acid transporter 1 =

Protein-coding gene in the species Homo sapiens

SLC7A9

Identifiers
- Aliases: SLC7A9, BAT1, CSNU3, solute carrier family 7 member 9
- External IDs: OMIM: 604144; MGI: 1353656; GeneCards: SLC7A9

Gene location (Human)
Chr.	Chromosome 19 (human)
Band	19q13.11	Start	32,830,509 bp
Band	19q13.11	End	32,869,767 bp

Gene location (Mouse)
Chr.	Chromosome 7 (mouse)
Band	7|7 B2	Start	35,148,221 bp
Band	7|7 B2	End	35,165,461 bp
RNA expression pattern
Bgee	Human / Mouse (ortholog); Top expressed in: mucosa of ileum; secondary oocyte; jejunal mucosa; kidney tubule; glomerulus; metanephric glomerulus; duodenum; human kidney; right lobe of liver; ventricular zone / Top expressed in: ileum; human kidney; right kidney; jejunum; duodenum; epithelium of small intestine; yolk sac; intestinal villus; migratory enteric neural crest cell; Ileal epithelium; More reference expression data
BioGPS	n/a
Gene ontology
Molecular function	peptide antigen binding; amino acid transmembrane transporter activity; L-cystine transmembrane transporter activity; neutral amino acid transmembrane transporter activity; protein binding; antiporter activity; transmembrane transporter activity; L-amino acid transmembrane transporter activity
Cellular component	integral component of membrane; membrane; integral component of plasma membrane; plasma membrane; apical plasma membrane; brush border membrane
Biological process	amino acid transmembrane transport; neutral amino acid transport; L-cystine transport; leukocyte migration; amino acid transport; transmembrane transport; protein-containing complex assembly; L-alpha-amino acid transmembrane transport
Sources:Amigo / QuickGO
Orthologs
Databases	NCBI: entry; OMA: entry
Species	Human	Mouse
Entrez	11136	30962
Ensembl	ENSG00000021488	ENSMUSG00000030492
UniProt	P82251	Q9QXA6
RefSeq (mRNA)	NM_001126335; NM_001243036; NM_014270	NM_001199015; NM_001199016; NM_021291
RefSeq (protein)	NP_001119807; NP_001229965; NP_055085	NP_001185944; NP_001185945; NP_067266
Location (UCSC)	Chr 19: 32.83 – 32.87 Mb	Chr 7: 35.15 – 35.17 Mb
PubMed search
- Wikidata
View/Edit Human	View/Edit Mouse

b(0,+)-type amino acid transporter 1, also known as b(0,+)AT1, is a protein which in humans is encoded by the SLC7A9 gene.

== Function ==
This gene encodes a protein that belongs to a family of light subunits of amino acid transporters. This protein plays a role in the high-affinity and sodium-independent transport of cystine and neutral and dibasic amino acids, and appears to function in the reabsorption of cystine in the kidney tubule. The protein associates with the protein coded for by SLC3A1.

== Clinical significance ==
Mutations in this gene cause non-type I cystinuria, a disease that leads to cystine stones in the urinary system due to impaired transport of cystine and dibasic amino acids.

== See also ==
- Heterodimeric amino acid transporter
- Solute carrier family
