= Y+L amino acid transporter 2 =

Protein-coding gene in the species Homo sapiens

SLC7A6

Identifiers
- Aliases: SLC7A6, LAT-2, LAT3, y+LAT-2, solute carrier family 7 member 6
- External IDs: OMIM: 605641; MGI: 2142598; GeneCards: SLC7A6

Gene location (Human)
Chr.	Chromosome 16 (human)
Band	16q22.1	Start	68,264,516 bp
Band	16q22.1	End	68,301,823 bp

Gene location (Mouse)
Chr.	Chromosome 8 (mouse)
Band	8|8 D3	Start	106,895,489 bp
Band	8|8 D3	End	106,925,338 bp
RNA expression pattern
Bgee	Human / Mouse (ortholog); Top expressed in: apex of heart; gastrocnemius muscle; gastric mucosa; subcutaneous adipose tissue; tibialis anterior muscle; left ventricle; tibial nerve; abdominal fat; left lobe of thyroid gland; right auricle of heart / Top expressed in: spermatocyte; primitive streak; embryo; neural tube; external carotid artery; abdominal wall; epiblast; ventricular zone; internal carotid artery; otic vesicle; More reference expression data
BioGPS	n/a
Gene ontology
Molecular function	L-amino acid transmembrane transporter activity; antiporter activity; amino acid transmembrane transporter activity; transmembrane transporter activity
Cellular component	integral component of membrane; basolateral plasma membrane; integral component of plasma membrane; membrane; plasma membrane; intracellular membrane-bounded organelle
Biological process	cellular amino acid metabolic process; amino acid transmembrane transport; amino acid transport; leukocyte migration; L-alpha-amino acid transmembrane transport; transmembrane transport; protein-containing complex assembly
Sources:Amigo / QuickGO
Orthologs
Databases	NCBI: entry; OMA: entry
Species	Human	Mouse
Entrez	9057	330836
Ensembl	ENSG00000103064	ENSMUSG00000031904
UniProt	Q92536	Q8BGK6
RefSeq (mRNA)	NM_001076785; NM_003983	NM_178798; NM_001357381; NM_001357382
RefSeq (protein)	NP_001070253; NP_003974; NP_001070253.1; NP_003974.3	NP_848913; NP_001344310; NP_001344311
Location (UCSC)	Chr 16: 68.26 – 68.3 Mb	Chr 8: 106.9 – 106.93 Mb
PubMed search
- Wikidata
View/Edit Human	View/Edit Mouse

Y+L amino acid transporter 2, also known as cationic amino acid transporter, y+ system, is a protein that in humans is encoded by the SLC7A6 gene.

== See also ==
- Heterodimeric amino acid transporter
