= Cationic amino acid transporter 4 =

Protein found in humans

SLC7A4

Identifiers
- Aliases: SLC7A4, CAT-4, CAT4, HCAT3, VH, solute carrier family 7 member 4
- External IDs: OMIM: 603752; MGI: 2146512; GeneCards: SLC7A4

Gene location (Human)
Chr.	Chromosome 22 (human)
Band	22q11.21	Start	21,028,718 bp
Band	22q11.21	End	21,032,840 bp

Gene location (Mouse)
Chr.	Chromosome 16 (mouse)
Band	16|16 A3	Start	17,389,882 bp
Band	16|16 A3	End	17,401,078 bp
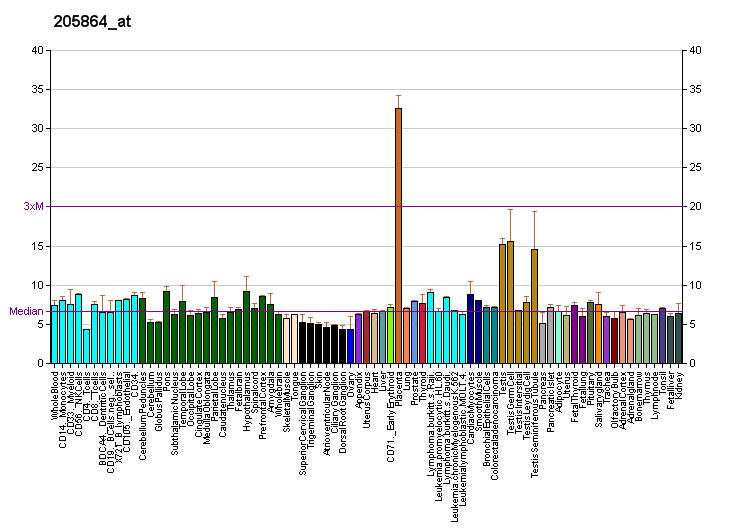

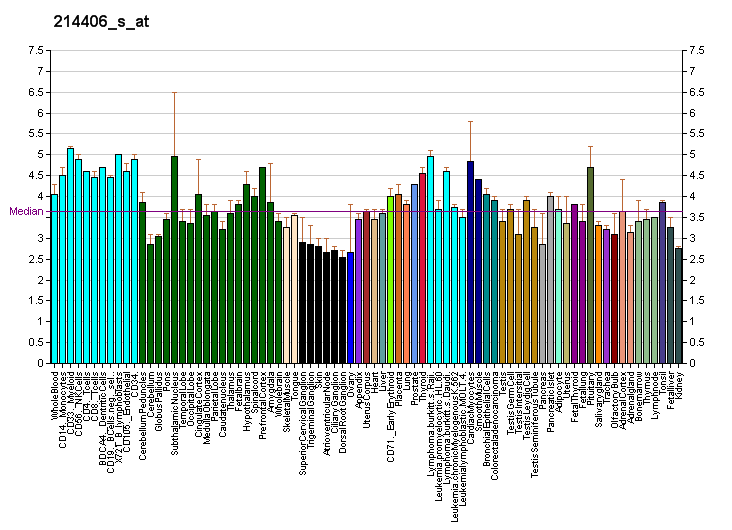
RNA expression pattern
Bgee	Human / Mouse (ortholog); Top expressed in: right testis; left testis; prefrontal cortex; right hemisphere of cerebellum; right adrenal gland; right adrenal cortex; gonad; right frontal lobe; left adrenal cortex; hypothalamus / Top expressed in: dentate gyrus of hippocampal formation granule cell; seminal vesicula; superior frontal gyrus; primary visual cortex; parotid gland; right ventricle; hippocampus proper; lacrimal gland; Region I of hippocampus proper; prefrontal cortex; More reference expression data
BioGPS	More reference expression data
Gene ontology
Molecular function	basic amino acid transmembrane transporter activity; transmembrane transporter activity; amino acid transmembrane transporter activity
Cellular component	integral component of membrane; membrane
Biological process	cellular amino acid metabolic process; amino acid transport; basic amino acid transmembrane transport; transmembrane transport; amino acid transmembrane transport
Sources:Amigo / QuickGO
Orthologs
Databases	NCBI: entry; OMA: entry
Species	Human	Mouse
Entrez	6545	224022
Ensembl	ENSG00000099960	ENSMUSG00000022756
UniProt	O43246	Q8BLQ7
RefSeq (mRNA)	NM_004173	NM_144852; NM_001359891; NM_001359892; NM_001359893
RefSeq (protein)	NP_004164	NP_659101; NP_001346820; NP_001346821; NP_001346822
Location (UCSC)	Chr 22: 21.03 – 21.03 Mb	Chr 16: 17.39 – 17.4 Mb
PubMed search
- Wikidata
View/Edit Human	View/Edit Mouse

Cationic amino acid transporter 4 is a protein that in humans is encoded by the SLC7A4 gene.

== See also ==
- SLC7A4+protein,+human at the U.S. National Library of Medicine Medical Subject Headings (MeSH)
