= Chloride potassium symporter =

Type of membrane transport protein

The chloride potassium symporter is a membrane transport protein of the solute carrier family 12 that is present in the S3-segment of the renal proximal tubule and in the neuron. It functions in renal chloride reabsorption to transport chloride across the basolateral membrane. Chloride potassium symporter can lower intracellular chloride concentrations below the electrochemical equilibrium potential.

The concentrations of K^{+} and Cl^{−} ions are high inside the cell due to the activities of Na^{+}/K^{+} ATPase and NKCC cotransporter, respectively. Hence, their net driving force acting on the K/Cl cotransporter favours the exit of both K^{+} and Cl^{−} from the cell.

== Types ==
Chloride potassium symporter are classified into:

- Chloride potassium symporter 4, predominating in the kidney.
- Chloride potassium symporter 5, predominating in neurons.

Each is encoded by a separate gene of the solute carrier family 12, hence accounting for the numbers succeeding its name. For example, chloride potassium symporter 5, or KCC2, is expressed through the SLC12A5 gene. Notably, symporters prior to 4 in the same family are other types of ion pumps. SLC12A3, for instance, is the sodium-chloride symporter.
