= Cationic amino acid transporter 2 =

Protein found in humans

SLC7A2

Identifiers
- Aliases: SLC7A2, ATRC2, CAT2, HCAT2, solute carrier family 7 member 2
- External IDs: OMIM: 601872; MGI: 99828; GeneCards: SLC7A2

Gene location (Human)
| Chr. | Chromosome 8 (human) |
| Band | 8p22 | Start | 17,497,088 bp |
| Band | 8p22 | End | 17,570,573 bp |

Gene location (Mouse)
| Chr. | Chromosome 8 (mouse) |
| Band | 8 A4|8 23.89 cM | Start | 41,315,433 bp |
| Band | 8 A4|8 23.89 cM | End | 41,375,345 bp |
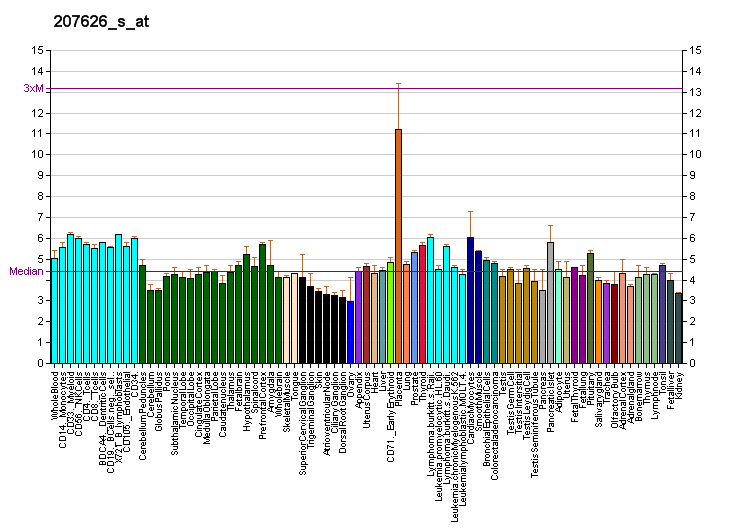
RNA expression pattern
| Bgee | Human / Mouse (ortholog); Top expressed in: Skeletal muscle tissue of rectus abdominis; biceps brachii; Skeletal muscle tissue of biceps brachii; islet of Langerhans; right lobe of liver; trigeminal ganglion; gastrocnemius muscle; bronchial epithelial cell; retinal pigment epithelium; right ovary / Top expressed in: epithelium of lens; Dermatocranium; membranous bone; left lobe of liver; mandible; maxilla; muscle of thigh; secondary oocyte; islet of Langerhans; ciliary body; More reference expression data |
| BioGPS | More reference expression data |
Gene ontology
| Molecular function | high-affinity lysine transmembrane transporter activity; low-affinity L-arginine transmembrane transporter activity; L-arginine transmembrane transporter activity; basic amino acid transmembrane transporter activity; high-affinity L-arginine transmembrane transporter activity; high-affinity L-ornithine transmembrane transporter activity; L-ornithine transmembrane transporter activity; L-lysine transmembrane transporter activity; amino acid transmembrane transporter activity; transmembrane transporter activity |
| Cellular component | integral component of membrane; membrane; integral component of plasma membrane; plasma membrane; cell junction |
| Biological process | nitric oxide biosynthetic process; cellular amino acid metabolic process; nitric oxide production involved in inflammatory response; regulation of inflammatory response; L-lysine import across plasma membrane; L-arginine import across plasma membrane; L-ornithine import across plasma membrane; macrophage activation; L-ornithine transmembrane transport; amino acid transport; regulation of macrophage activation; transmembrane transport; L-lysine transmembrane transport |
Sources:Amigo / QuickGO
Orthologs
| Databases | NCBI: entry; OMA: entry |
| Species | Human | Mouse |
| Entrez | 6542 | 11988 |
| Ensembl | ENSG00000003989 | ENSMUSG00000031596 |
| UniProt | P52569 | P18581 |
| RefSeq (mRNA) | NM_001008539; NM_001164771; NM_003046; NM_001370337; NM_001370338 | NM_001044740; NM_007514 |
| RefSeq (protein) | NP_001008539; NP_001158243; NP_003037; NP_001357266; NP_001357267 | NP_001038205; NP_031540 |
| Location (UCSC) | Chr 8: 17.5 – 17.57 Mb | Chr 8: 41.32 – 41.38 Mb |
| PubMed search |
- Wikidata
| View/Edit Human | View/Edit Mouse |

Cationic amino acid transporter 2 is a protein that in humans is encoded by the SLC7A2 gene.

== See also ==
- SLC7A2+protein,+human at the U.S. National Library of Medicine Medical Subject Headings (MeSH)
