= Y+L amino acid transporter 1 =

Protein-coding gene in the species Homo sapiens

SLC7A7

Identifiers
- Aliases: SLC7A7, LAT3, LPI, MOP-2, Y+LAT1, y+LAT-1, solute carrier family 7 member 7
- External IDs: OMIM: 603593; MGI: 1337120; GeneCards: SLC7A7

Gene location (Human)
Chr.	Chromosome 14 (human)
Band	14q11.2	Start	22,773,222 bp
Band	14q11.2	End	22,829,820 bp

Gene location (Mouse)
Chr.	Chromosome 14 (mouse)
Band	14|14 C2	Start	54,606,899 bp
Band	14|14 C2	End	54,655,237 bp
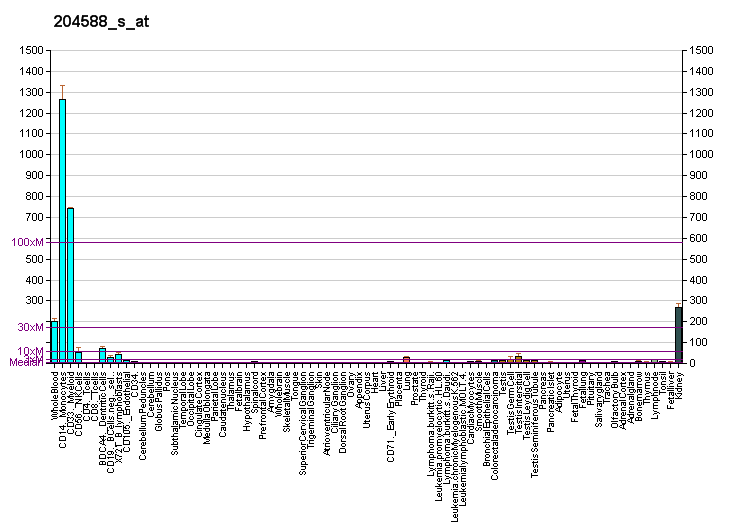
RNA expression pattern
Bgee	Human / Mouse (ortholog); Top expressed in: secondary oocyte; monocyte; granulocyte; jejunal mucosa; mucosa of ileum; kidney tubule; blood; spleen; duodenum; glomerulus / Top expressed in: right kidney; lumbar spinal ganglion; ileum; human kidney; yolk sac; jejunum; epithelium of small intestine; duodenum; intestinal villus; Ileal epithelium; More reference expression data
BioGPS	More reference expression data
Gene ontology
Molecular function	L-amino acid transmembrane transporter activity; basic amino acid transmembrane transporter activity; antiporter activity; transmembrane transporter activity
Cellular component	integral component of membrane; membrane; plasma membrane; integral component of plasma membrane; basolateral plasma membrane
Biological process	basic amino acid transmembrane transport; cellular amino acid metabolic process; regulation of arginine metabolic process; amino acid transport; leukocyte migration; L-alpha-amino acid transmembrane transport; transmembrane transport; protein-containing complex assembly
Sources:Amigo / QuickGO
Orthologs
Databases	NCBI: entry; OMA: entry
Species	Human	Mouse
Entrez	9056	20540
Ensembl	ENSG00000155465	ENSMUSG00000000958
UniProt	Q9UM01	Q9Z1K8
RefSeq (mRNA)	NM_001126105; NM_001126106; NM_003982	NM_001253679; NM_001253680; NM_011405; NM_001379497; NM_001379498 NM_001379499
RefSeq (protein)	NP_001119577; NP_001119578; NP_003973	NP_001240608; NP_001240609; NP_035535; NP_001366426; NP_001366427 NP_001366428
Location (UCSC)	Chr 14: 22.77 – 22.83 Mb	Chr 14: 54.61 – 54.66 Mb
PubMed search
- Wikidata
View/Edit Human	View/Edit Mouse

Y+L amino acid transporter 1 is a protein that in humans is encoded by the SLC7A7 gene.

== Interactions ==
SLC7A7 has been shown to interact with SLC3A2.

== See also ==
- Heterodimeric amino acid transporter
- Solute carrier family
- Lysinuric protein intolerance
