= High affinity cationic amino acid transporter 1 =

Protein-coding gene in the species Homo sapiens

SLC7A1

Identifiers
- Aliases: SLC7A1, ATRC1, CAT-1, ERR, HCAT1, REC1L, solute carrier family 7 member 1
- External IDs: OMIM: 104615; MGI: 88117; GeneCards: SLC7A1

Gene location (Human)
Chr.	Chromosome 13 (human)
Band	13q12.3	Start	29,509,414 bp
Band	13q12.3	End	29,595,688 bp

Gene location (Mouse)
Chr.	Chromosome 5 (mouse)
Band	5 G3|5 88.48 cM	Start	148,264,220 bp
Band	5 G3|5 88.48 cM	End	148,336,714 bp
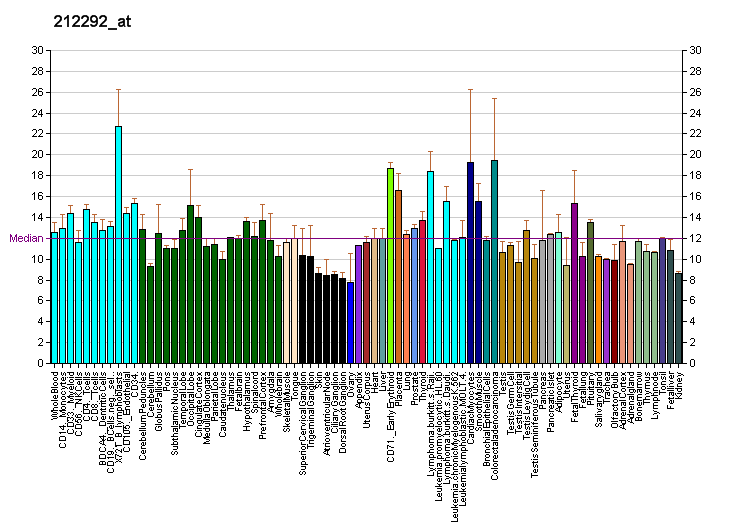

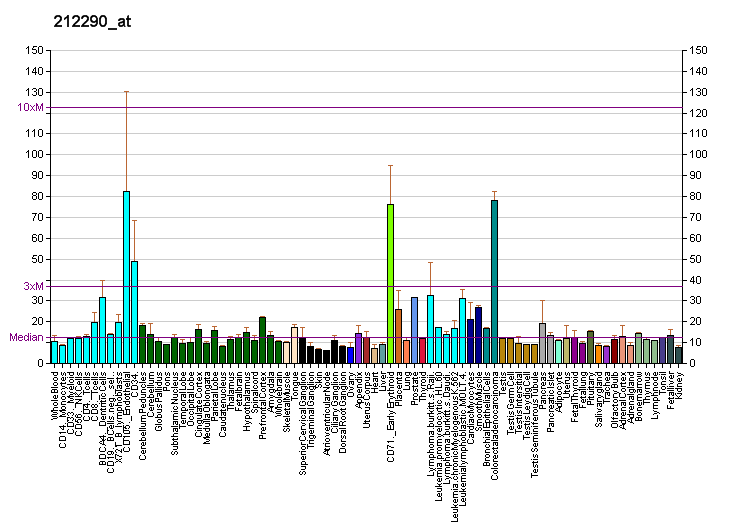

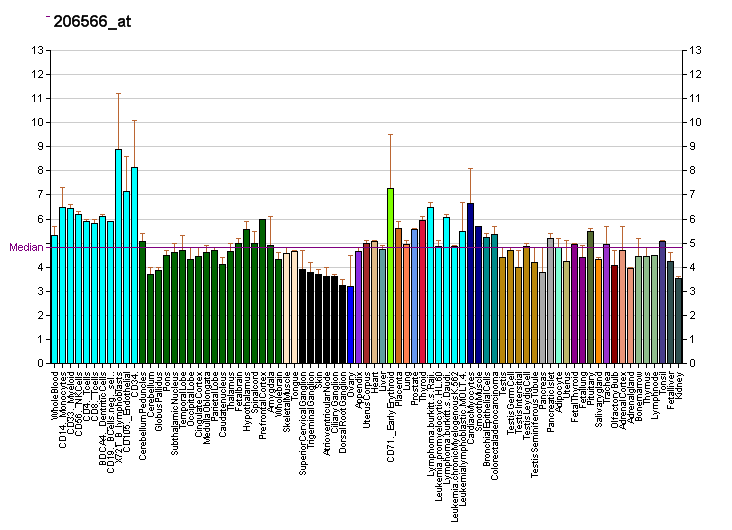
RNA expression pattern
Bgee	Human / Mouse (ortholog); Top expressed in: gums; gingival epithelium; endothelial cell; buccal mucosa cell; parotid gland; mucosa of pharynx; oral cavity; corpus epididymis; Epithelium of choroid plexus; dorsal motor nucleus of vagus nerve / Top expressed in: cumulus cell; lacrimal gland; utricle; Paneth cell; hair follicle; condyle; conjunctival fornix; endothelial cell of lymphatic vessel; seminal vesicula; facial motor nucleus; More reference expression data
BioGPS	More reference expression data
Gene ontology
Molecular function	protein binding; amino acid transmembrane transporter activity; L-ornithine transmembrane transporter activity; L-lysine transmembrane transporter activity; transmembrane transporter activity
Cellular component	integral component of membrane; integral component of plasma membrane; membrane; plasma membrane; protein-containing complex
Biological process	amino acid transmembrane transport; L-arginine transmembrane transport; amino acid transport; transport; transmembrane transport; L-arginine import across plasma membrane; L-ornithine transmembrane transport; L-lysine transmembrane transport
Sources:Amigo / QuickGO
Orthologs
Databases	NCBI: entry; OMA: entry
Species	Human	Mouse
Entrez	6541	11987
Ensembl	ENSG00000139514	ENSMUSG00000041313
UniProt	P30825	Q09143
RefSeq (mRNA)	NM_003045	NM_001301424; NM_007513
RefSeq (protein)	NP_003036	NP_001288353; NP_031539
Location (UCSC)	Chr 13: 29.51 – 29.6 Mb	Chr 5: 148.26 – 148.34 Mb
PubMed search
- Wikidata
View/Edit Human	View/Edit Mouse

High affinity cationic amino acid transporter 1 is a protein that in humans is encoded by the SLC7A1 gene.

== See also ==
- Solute carrier family
