= Large neutral amino acids transporter small subunit 2 =

Protein found in humans

SLC7A8

Identifiers
- Aliases: SLC7A8, LAT2, LPI-PC1, solute carrier family 7 member 8
- External IDs: OMIM: 604235; MGI: 1355323; GeneCards: SLC7A8

Gene location (Human)
Chr.	Chromosome 14 (human)
Band	14q11.2	Start	23,125,295 bp
Band	14q11.2	End	23,183,674 bp

Gene location (Mouse)
Chr.	Chromosome 14 (mouse)
Band	14|14 C2	Start	54,959,666 bp
Band	14|14 C2	End	55,019,403 bp
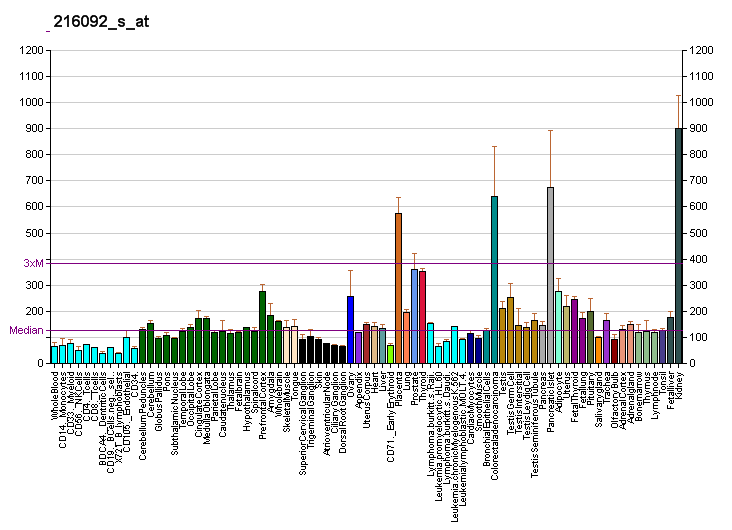

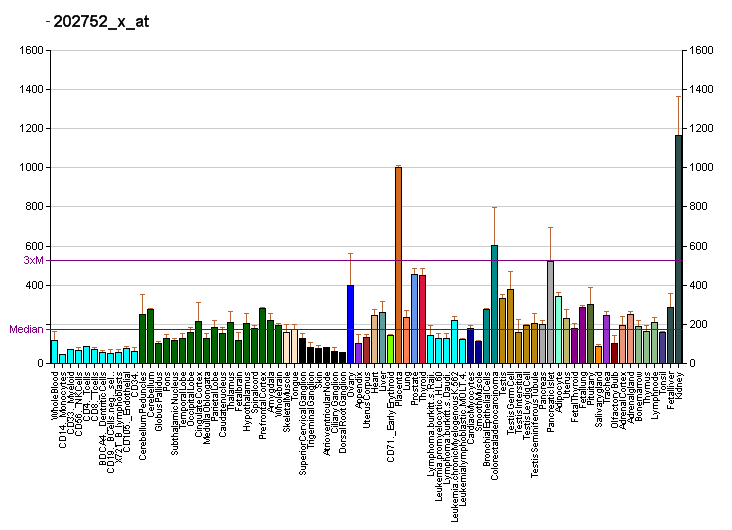

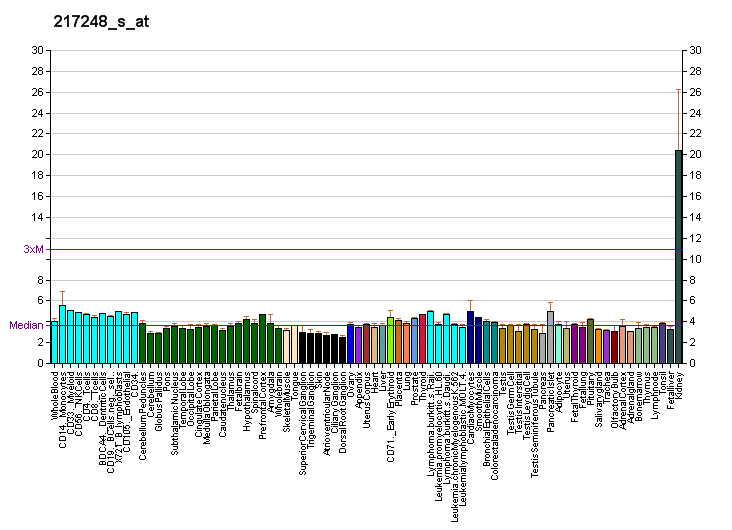
RNA expression pattern
Bgee	Human / Mouse (ortholog); Top expressed in: islet of Langerhans; left uterine tube; beta cell; gastric mucosa; right ovary; human kidney; left ovary; oocyte; retinal pigment epithelium; decidua / Top expressed in: yolk sac; epithelium of lens; right kidney; lip; islet of Langerhans; gastrula; decidua; superior frontal gyrus; muscle of thigh; dentate gyrus of hippocampal formation granule cell; More reference expression data
BioGPS	More reference expression data
Gene ontology
Molecular function	peptide antigen binding; L-amino acid transmembrane transporter activity; neutral amino acid transmembrane transporter activity; toxin transmembrane transporter activity; protein binding; antiporter activity; organic cation transmembrane transporter activity; amino acid transmembrane transporter activity; transmembrane transporter activity
Cellular component	cytoplasm; integral component of membrane; membrane; plasma membrane; integral component of plasma membrane; basolateral plasma membrane
Biological process	amino acid transmembrane transport; cellular amino acid metabolic process; metal ion homeostasis; L-amino acid transport; L-alpha-amino acid transmembrane transport; amino acid transport; response to toxic substance; neutral amino acid transport; leukocyte migration; toxin transport; organic cation transport; transmembrane transport
Sources:Amigo / QuickGO
Orthologs
Databases	NCBI: entry; OMA: entry
Species	Human	Mouse
Entrez	23428	50934
Ensembl	ENSG00000092068	ENSMUSG00000022180
UniProt	Q9UHI5	Q9QXW9
RefSeq (mRNA)	NM_001267036; NM_001267037; NM_012244; NM_182728	NM_016972
RefSeq (protein)	NP_001253965; NP_001253966; NP_036376; NP_877392	NP_058668
Location (UCSC)	Chr 14: 23.13 – 23.18 Mb	Chr 14: 54.96 – 55.02 Mb
PubMed search
- Wikidata
View/Edit Human	View/Edit Mouse

Large neutral amino acids transporter small subunit 2 is a protein that in humans is encoded by the SLC7A8 gene.

== See also ==
- Heterodimeric amino acid transporter
- Solute carrier family
