= SLC3A1 =

Protein-coding gene in the species Homo sapiens

An Error has occurred retrieving Wikidata item for infobox Neutral and basic amino acid transport protein rBAT is a protein that in humans is encoded by the SLC3A1 gene.

Mutations in the SLC3A1 gene are associated with cystinuria.

== See also ==
- Heterodimeric amino acid transporter
- Solute carrier family
