= SLC7A14 =

Protein-coding gene in the species Homo sapiens

Identifiers
- Aliases: SLC7A14, PPP1R142, solute carrier family 7 member 14
- External IDs: OMIM: 615720; MGI: 3040688; GeneCards: SLC7A14

Gene location (Human)
Chr.	Chromosome 3 (human)
Band	3q26.2	Start	170,459,548 bp
Band	3q26.2	End	170,586,075 bp

Gene location (Mouse)
Chr.	Chromosome 3 (mouse)
Band	3|3 A3	Start	31,257,007 bp
Band	3|3 A3	End	31,364,527 bp
RNA expression pattern
Bgee	Human / Mouse (ortholog); Top expressed in: cerebellar vermis; postcentral gyrus; Brodmann area 46; middle temporal gyrus; superior frontal gyrus; pons; superior vestibular nucleus; entorhinal cortex; Brodmann area 23; prefrontal cortex / Top expressed in: superior cervical ganglion; facial motor nucleus; dorsomedial hypothalamic nucleus; pontine nuclei; ventromedial nucleus; central gray substance of midbrain; medial vestibular nucleus; dentate gyrus; lateral hypothalamus; anterior horn of spinal cord; More reference expression data
BioGPS	n/a
Gene ontology
Molecular function	transmembrane transporter activity
Cellular component	integral component of membrane; lysosomal membrane; lysosome; membrane
Biological process	negative regulation of phosphatase activity; amino acid transport; transmembrane transport
Sources:Amigo / QuickGO
Orthologs
Databases	NCBI: entry; OMA: entry
Species	Human	Mouse
Entrez	57709	241919
Ensembl	ENSG00000013293	ENSMUSG00000069072
UniProt	Q8TBB6	Q8BXR1
RefSeq (mRNA)	NM_020949; NM_175917	NM_172861
RefSeq (protein)	NP_066000	NP_766449
Location (UCSC)	Chr 3: 170.46 – 170.59 Mb	Chr 3: 31.26 – 31.36 Mb
PubMed search
- Wikidata
View/Edit Human	View/Edit Mouse

Solute carrier family 7, member 14 is a protein that in humans is encoded by the SLC7A14 gene.

This gene is predicted to encode a glycosylated, cationic amino acid transporter protein with 14 transmembrane domains. This gene is primarily expressed in skin fibroblasts, neural tissuee, photoreceptor cells, hair cells and primary endothelial cells and its protein is predicted to mediate lysosomal uptake of cationic amino acids. In mice, this gene is expressed in the photoreceptor layer of the retina where its expression increases over the course of retinal development and persists in the mature retina. The gene is also highly expressed in all vertebrate hair cells. In the mammalian inner ear, this gene is expressed in neonatal inner and outer hair cells during development and becomes specifically expressed in inner hair cells in adult animals.Mutations in this gene are associated with autosomal recessive retinitis pigmentosa and hearing loss in the form of auditory neuropathy.
