= Lysinuric protein intolerance =

- Other names: Hyperdibasic aminoaciduria type 2,Cationic aminoaciduria or Familial protein intolerance
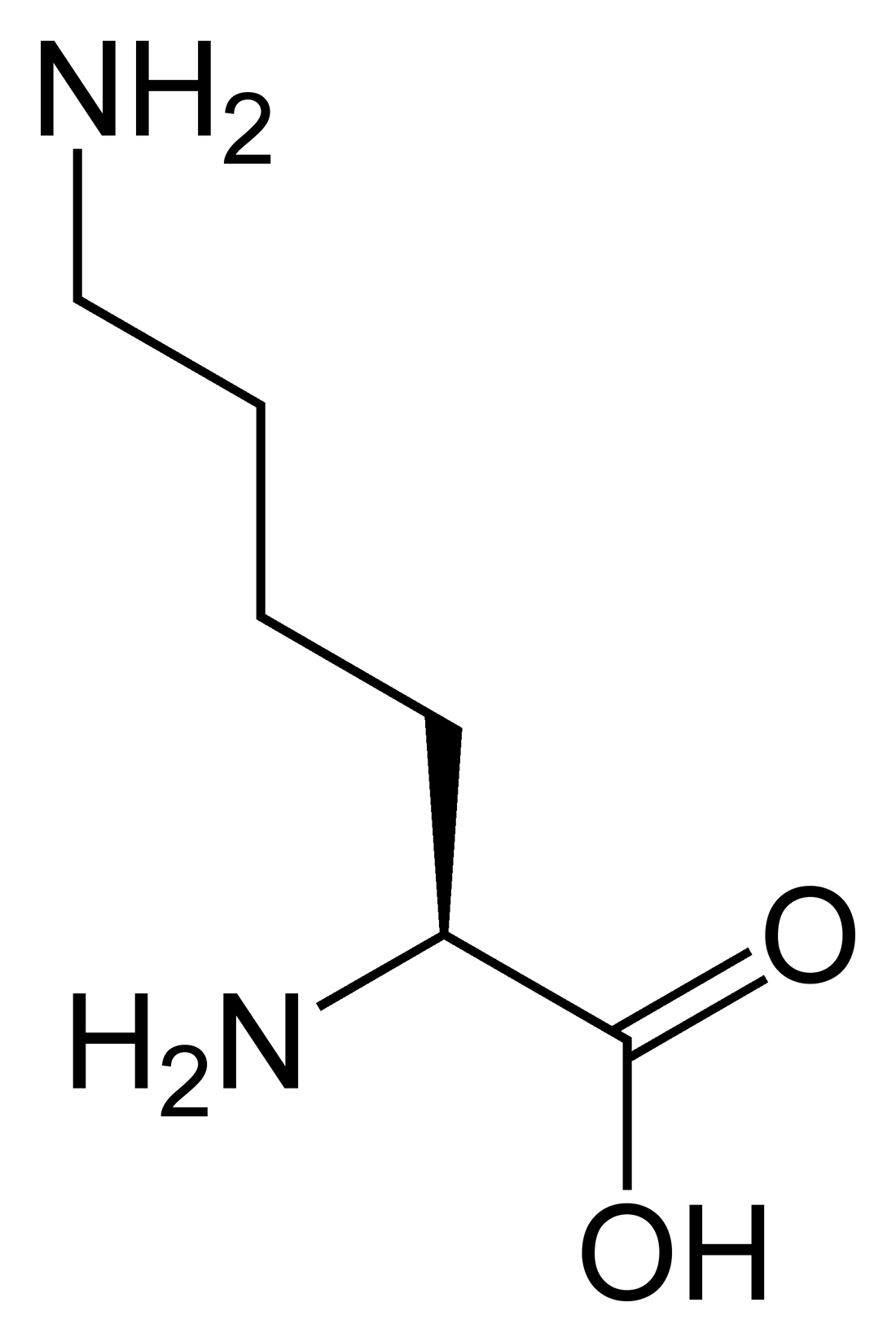
- Lysine
- Specialty: Endocrinology

Lysinuric protein intolerance (LPI) is an autosomal recessive metabolic disorder affecting amino acid transport. It is characterised by the body's inability to properly digest and use certain proteins. This condition leads to various metabolic complications and is typically diagnosed in infancy or early childhood.

About 140 patients have been reported, almost half of them of Finnish origin. Individuals from Japan, Italy, Morocco and North Africa have also been reported plus one in Bixby, Oklahoma.

== Signs and symptoms ==
Infants with LPI are usually symptom-free when breastfed because of the low protein concentration in human milk, but develop vomiting and diarrhea after weaning. The patients show failure to thrive, poor appetite, growth retardation, enlarged liver and spleen, prominent osteoporosis and osteopenia, delayed bone age and spontaneous protein aversion. Forced feeding of protein may lead to convulsions and coma. Mental development is normal if prolonged episode of hyperammonemia can be avoided. Some patients develop severe pulmonary and kidney complications. High levels of plasma glutamine and glycine are observed.

== Genetic Basis ==
LPI has been associated with SLC7A7. LPI is caused by mutations in the SLC7A7 gene, which encodes for a protein involved in the transport of amino acids across cell membranes. Mutations in this gene impair the transport function, leading to the characteristic amino acid imbalances seen in LPI patients.

== Mechanism ==
Lysinuric protein intolerance has an autosomal recessive pattern of inheritance.

In LPI, urinary excretion of cationic amino acids (ornithine, arginine and lysine) is increased and these amino acids are poorly absorbed from the intestine. Therefore, their plasma concentrations are low and their body pools become depleted. Deficiency of arginine and ornithine restricts the function of the urea cycle and leads to hyperammonemia after protein-rich meals. Deficiency of lysine may play a major role in the skeletal and immunological abnormalities observed in LPI patients.

== Clinical Features ==
The symptoms of LPI typically appear after weaning from breast milk to a protein-rich diet. Common symptoms include poor growth, muscle weakness, enlarged liver and spleen, and frequent infections. Neurological symptoms such as confusion and seizures can also occur.

== Diagnosis ==
The diagnosis is based on the biochemical findings (increased concentrations of lysine, arginine and ornithine in urine and low concentrations of these amino acids in plasma, elevation of urinary orotic acid excretion after protein-rich meals, and inappropriately high concentrations of serum ferritin and lactate dehydrogenase isoenzymes) and the screening of known mutations of the causative gene from a DNA sample.

== Treatment ==
Treatment of LPI consists of protein-restricted diet and supplementation with oral citrulline. Citrulline is a neutral amino acid that improves the function of the urea cycle and allows sufficient protein intake without hyperammonemia.

== Prognosis ==
Under proper dietary control and supplementation, the majority of the LPI patients are able to have a nearly normal life. However, severe complications including pulmonary alveolar proteinosis and chronic kidney disease may develop even with proper treatment.Fertility appears to be normal in women, but mothers with LPI have an increased risk for complications during pregnancy and delivery.
