= SLC12A9 =

Protein-coding gene in the species Homo sapiens

Identifiers
- Aliases: SLC12A9, CCC6, CIP1, WO3.3, hCCC6, solute carrier family 12 member 9
- External IDs: OMIM: 616861; MGI: 1933532; GeneCards: SLC12A9

Gene location (Human)
Chr.	Chromosome 7 (human)
Band	7q22.1	Start	100,826,820 bp
Band	7q22.1	End	100,867,010 bp

Gene location (Mouse)
Chr.	Chromosome 5 (mouse)
Band	5|5 G2	Start	137,314,558 bp
Band	5|5 G2	End	137,333,597 bp
RNA expression pattern
Bgee	Human / Mouse (ortholog); Top expressed in: granulocyte; monocyte; blood; spleen; C1 segment; mucosa of transverse colon; right hemisphere of cerebellum; body of uterus; lymph node; right ovary / Top expressed in: neural layer of retina; granulocyte; secondary oocyte; yolk sac; otic vesicle; Rostral migratory stream; primary oocyte; internal carotid artery; external carotid artery; superior frontal gyrus; More reference expression data
BioGPS	n/a
Gene ontology
Molecular function	potassium:chloride symporter activity; transporter activity; cation:chloride symporter activity
Cellular component	extracellular exosome; plasma membrane; membrane; integral component of membrane
Biological process	ion transport; transmembrane transport; potassium ion transmembrane transport; chloride transmembrane transport; chloride transport; transport; cell volume homeostasis; chloride ion homeostasis; potassium ion homeostasis; potassium ion import across plasma membrane
Sources:Amigo / QuickGO
Orthologs
Databases	NCBI: entry; OMA: entry
Species	Human	Mouse
Entrez	56996	83704
Ensembl	ENSG00000146828	ENSMUSG00000037344
UniProt	Q9BXP2	Q99MR3
RefSeq (mRNA)	NM_001267812; NM_001267814; NM_020246; NM_001363493; NM_001363494	NM_031406; NM_001359611
RefSeq (protein)	NP_001254741; NP_001254743; NP_064631; NP_001350422; NP_001350423	NP_113583; NP_001346540
Location (UCSC)	Chr 7: 100.83 – 100.87 Mb	Chr 5: 137.31 – 137.33 Mb
PubMed search
- Wikidata
View/Edit Human	View/Edit Mouse

Solute carrier family 12 member 9 (SLC12A9), also known as cation-chloride cotransporter 6 (CCC6) or cation-chloride cotransporter-interacting protein 1 (CIP1), is a protein that in humans is encoded by the SLC12A9 gene.
