= Asc-type amino acid transporter 1 =

Protein-coding gene in the species Homo sapiens

SLC7A10

Identifiers
- Aliases: SLC7A10, HASC-1, asc-1, ASC1, solute carrier family 7 member 10
- External IDs: OMIM: 607959; MGI: 1858261; GeneCards: SLC7A10

Gene location (Human)
Chr.	Chromosome 19 (human)
Band	19q13.11	Start	33,208,664 bp
Band	19q13.11	End	33,225,850 bp

Gene location (Mouse)
Chr.	Chromosome 7 (mouse)
Band	7 B2|7 21.13 cM	Start	34,885,810 bp
Band	7 B2|7 21.13 cM	End	34,900,539 bp
RNA expression pattern
Bgee	Human / Mouse (ortholog); Top expressed in: caudate nucleus; nucleus accumbens; putamen; amygdala; subcutaneous adipose tissue; right frontal lobe; anterior cingulate cortex; gonad; hypothalamus; substantia nigra / Top expressed in: lumbar subsegment of spinal cord; deep cerebellar nuclei; medial vestibular nucleus; white adipose tissue; Epithelium of choroid plexus; central gray substance of midbrain; mammillary body; dorsal tegmental nucleus; subcutaneous adipose tissue; inferior colliculi; More reference expression data
BioGPS	n/a
Gene ontology
Molecular function	antiporter activity; L-serine transmembrane transporter activity; neutral amino acid transmembrane transporter activity; transmembrane transporter activity; L-amino acid transmembrane transporter activity
Cellular component	integral component of membrane; plasma membrane; membrane; integral component of plasma membrane
Biological process	leukocyte migration; neutral amino acid transport; D-alanine transport; amino acid transport; D-serine transport; L-serine transport; transmembrane transport; L-alpha-amino acid transmembrane transport
Sources:Amigo / QuickGO
Orthologs
Databases	NCBI: entry; OMA: entry
Species	Human	Mouse
Entrez	56301	53896
Ensembl	ENSG00000130876	ENSMUSG00000030495
UniProt	Q9NS82	P63115
RefSeq (mRNA)	NM_019849	NM_017394
RefSeq (protein)	NP_062823	NP_059090
Location (UCSC)	Chr 19: 33.21 – 33.23 Mb	Chr 7: 34.89 – 34.9 Mb
PubMed search
- Wikidata
View/Edit Human	View/Edit Mouse

Asc-type amino acid transporter 1 (Asc-1) is a protein that in humans is encoded by the SLC7A10 gene.

== See also ==
- Heterodimeric amino acid transporter
