= SLC12A7 =

Protein-coding gene in the species Homo sapiens

Identifiers
- Aliases: SLC12A7, KCC4, solute carrier family 12 member 7
- External IDs: OMIM: 604879; MGI: 1342283; GeneCards: SLC12A7

Gene location (Human)
Chr.	Chromosome 5 (human)
Band	5p15.33	Start	1,050,384 bp
Band	5p15.33	End	1,112,063 bp

Gene location (Mouse)
Chr.	Chromosome 13 (mouse)
Band	13 C1|13 40.15 cM	Start	73,881,213 bp
Band	13 C1|13 40.15 cM	End	73,964,873 bp
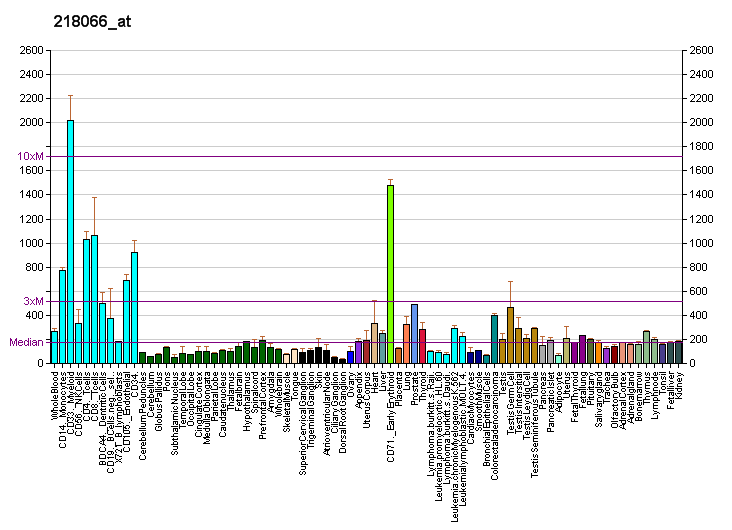
RNA expression pattern
Bgee	Human / Mouse (ortholog); Top expressed in: apex of heart; left ventricle; right lobe of liver; gallbladder; duodenum; right auricle of heart; human kidney; body of stomach; spleen; granulocyte / Top expressed in: vestibular membrane of cochlear duct; right ventricle; myocardium of ventricle; transitional epithelium of urinary bladder; cardiac muscle tissue of left ventricle; lumbar spinal ganglion; epithelium of stomach; left lobe of liver; interventricular septum; right kidney; More reference expression data
BioGPS	More reference expression data
Gene ontology
Molecular function	transporter activity; cation:chloride symporter activity; symporter activity; protein kinase binding; potassium:chloride symporter activity
Cellular component	integral component of membrane; integral component of plasma membrane; membrane; plasma membrane; protein-containing complex
Biological process	potassium ion transport; cell volume homeostasis; chloride transmembrane transport; chemical synaptic transmission; potassium ion transmembrane transport; transmembrane transport; ion transport; chloride ion homeostasis; potassium ion homeostasis; potassium ion import across plasma membrane
Sources:Amigo / QuickGO
Orthologs
Databases	NCBI: entry; OMA: entry
Species	Human	Mouse
Entrez	10723	20499
Ensembl	ENSG00000276482; ENSG00000113504	ENSMUSG00000017756
UniProt	Q9Y666	Q9WVL3
RefSeq (mRNA)	NM_006598	NM_011390; NM_001360694
RefSeq (protein)	NP_006589	NP_035520; NP_001347623
Location (UCSC)	Chr 5: 1.05 – 1.11 Mb	Chr 13: 73.88 – 73.96 Mb
PubMed search
- Wikidata
View/Edit Human	View/Edit Mouse

Solute carrier family 12 member 7 is a protein that in humans is encoded by the SLC12A7 gene.

== See also ==
- Solute carrier family
- cotransporter
