= SLC12A6 =

Protein-coding gene in the species Homo sapiens

Identifiers
- Aliases: SLC12A6, ACCPN, KCC3, KCC3A, KCC3B, solute carrier family 12 member 6
- External IDs: OMIM: 604878; MGI: 2135960; GeneCards: SLC12A6

Gene location (Human)
Chr.	Chromosome 15 (human)
Band	15q14	Start	34,229,784 bp
Band	15q14	End	34,338,060 bp

Gene location (Mouse)
Chr.	Chromosome 2 (mouse)
Band	2|2 E3	Start	112,096,170 bp
Band	2|2 E3	End	112,193,508 bp
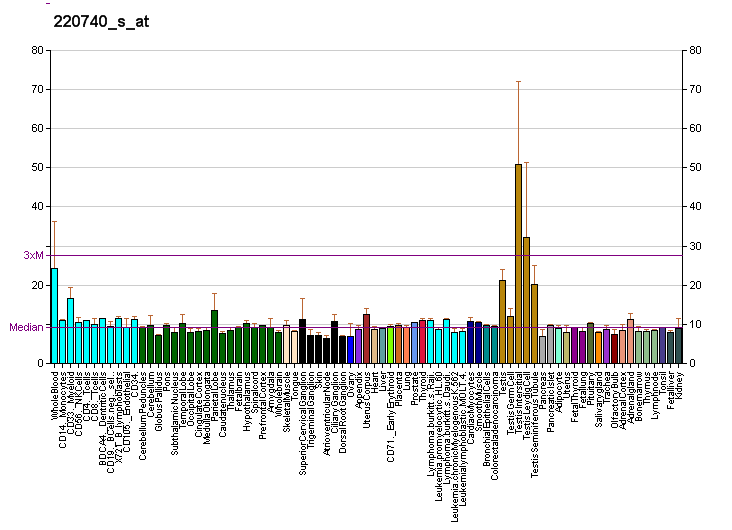
RNA expression pattern
Bgee	Human / Mouse (ortholog); Top expressed in: blood; secondary oocyte; trabecular bone; sperm; mucosa of pharynx; monocyte; oral cavity; gums; pons; gingival epithelium / Top expressed in: granulocyte; neural layer of retina; transitional epithelium of urinary bladder; primary visual cortex; superior frontal gyrus; dentate gyrus of hippocampal formation granule cell; cerebellar cortex; spleen; blood; spermatocyte; More reference expression data
BioGPS	More reference expression data
Gene ontology
Molecular function	cation:chloride symporter activity; transporter activity; potassium ion transmembrane transporter activity; symporter activity; protein kinase binding; potassium:chloride symporter activity
Cellular component	integral component of membrane; membrane; plasma membrane; integral component of plasma membrane; basolateral plasma membrane
Biological process	cellular hypotonic salinity response; cellular hypotonic response; chloride transmembrane transport; ion transport; potassium ion transport; angiogenesis; chemical synaptic transmission; potassium ion transmembrane transport; transmembrane transport; cell volume homeostasis; chloride ion homeostasis; potassium ion homeostasis; potassium ion import across plasma membrane
Sources:Amigo / QuickGO
Orthologs
Databases	NCBI: entry; OMA: entry
Species	Human	Mouse
Entrez	9990	107723
Ensembl	ENSG00000140199	ENSMUSG00000027130
UniProt	Q9UHW9	Q924N4
RefSeq (mRNA)	NM_001042494; NM_001042495; NM_001042496; NM_001042497; NM_005135 NM_133647; NM_001365088	NM_133648; NM_133649; NM_001362700
RefSeq (protein)	NP_001035959; NP_001035960; NP_001035961; NP_001035962; NP_005126 NP_598408; NP_001352017	NP_598409; NP_598410; NP_001349629
Location (UCSC)	Chr 15: 34.23 – 34.34 Mb	Chr 2: 112.1 – 112.19 Mb
PubMed search
- Wikidata
View/Edit Human	View/Edit Mouse

Solute carrier family 12 member 6 is a protein that in humans is encoded by the SLC12A6 gene.

This gene is a member of the K-Cl cotransporter (KCC) family. K-Cl cotransporters are integral membrane proteins that lower intracellular chloride concentrations below the electrochemical equilibrium potential. The proteins encoded by this gene are activated by cell swelling induced by hypotonic conditions. Alternate splicing results in multiple transcript variants encoding different isoforms, the most important ones being KCC3a and KCC3b. Mutations in this gene are associated with agenesis of the corpus callosum with peripheral neuropathy.

== See also ==
- Solute carrier family
