= SLC12A8 =

Protein-coding gene in the species Homo sapiens

Identifiers
- Aliases: SLC12A8, CCC9, solute carrier family 12 member 8
- External IDs: OMIM: 611316; MGI: 2443672; GeneCards: SLC12A8

Gene location (Human)
Chr.	Chromosome 3 (human)
Band	3q21.2	Start	125,082,636 bp
Band	3q21.2	End	125,212,864 bp

Gene location (Mouse)
Chr.	Chromosome 16 (mouse)
Band	16|16 B3	Start	33,337,698 bp
Band	16|16 B3	End	33,484,505 bp
RNA expression pattern
Bgee	Human / Mouse (ortholog); Top expressed in: right lobe of thyroid gland; left lobe of thyroid gland; oocyte; parotid gland; periodontal fiber; gallbladder; decidua; secondary oocyte; body of pancreas; pancreatic ductal cell / Top expressed in: gastrula; submandibular gland; parotid gland; crypt of lieberkuhn of small intestine; duodenum; large intestine; colon; pyloric antrum; ileum; jejunum; More reference expression data
BioGPS	n/a
Gene ontology
Molecular function	symporter activity; potassium:chloride symporter activity
Cellular component	integral component of membrane; membrane
Biological process	potassium ion transport; ion transport; transmembrane transport; potassium ion transmembrane transport; cell volume homeostasis; chloride ion homeostasis; potassium ion homeostasis; chloride transmembrane transport; potassium ion import across plasma membrane
Sources:Amigo / QuickGO
Orthologs
Databases	NCBI: entry; OMA: entry
Species	Human	Mouse
Entrez	84561	171286
Ensembl	ENSG00000221955	ENSMUSG00000035506
UniProt	A0AV02; H7C5L2	Q8VI23
RefSeq (mRNA)	NM_024628; NM_001195483	NM_001083902; NM_134251; NM_001370999
RefSeq (protein)	NP_001182412; NP_078904	NP_001077371; NP_599012; NP_001357928
Location (UCSC)	Chr 3: 125.08 – 125.21 Mb	Chr 16: 33.34 – 33.48 Mb
PubMed search
- Wikidata
View/Edit Human	View/Edit Mouse

Solute carrier family 12 member 8 (SLC12A8), also known as cation-chloride cotransporter 9 (CCC9), is a protein that in humans is encoded by the SLC12A8 gene.
