= Chloride potassium symporter 5 =

Protein found in humans

SLC12A5

Identifiers
- Aliases: SLC12A5, KCC2, Chloride potassium symporter 5, EIEE34, EIG14, hKCC2, solute carrier family 12 member 5, DEE34
- External IDs: OMIM: 606726; MGI: 1862037; GeneCards: SLC12A5

Gene location (Human)
Chr.	Chromosome 20 (human)
Band	20q13.12	Start	46,021,690 bp
Band	20q13.12	End	46,060,150 bp

Gene location (Mouse)
Chr.	Chromosome 2 (mouse)
Band	2|2 H3	Start	164,802,722 bp
Band	2|2 H3	End	164,841,651 bp
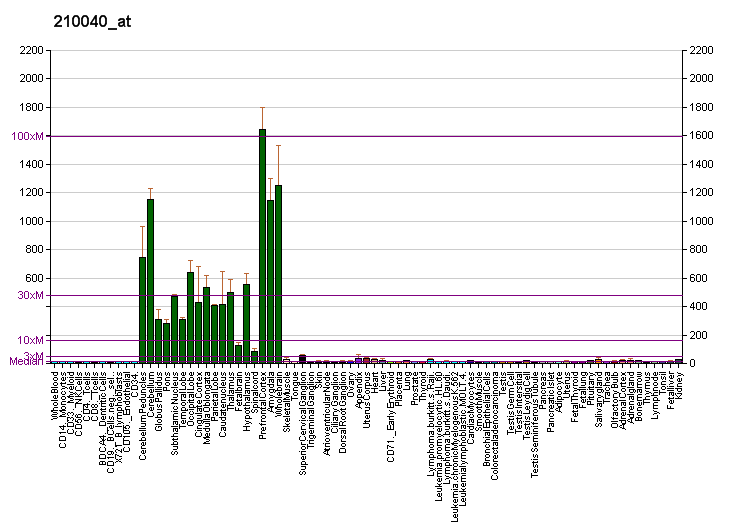
RNA expression pattern
Bgee	Human / Mouse (ortholog); Top expressed in: right hemisphere of cerebellum; lateral nuclear group of thalamus; Brodmann area 23; Brodmann area 10; primary visual cortex; dorsolateral prefrontal cortex; Brodmann area 9; frontal pole; orbitofrontal cortex; superior frontal gyrus / Top expressed in: dorsal tegmental nucleus; anterior amygdaloid area; medial geniculate nucleus; globus pallidus; lateral hypothalamus; subiculum; olfactory tubercle; paraventricular nucleus of hypothalamus; medial dorsal nucleus; dorsomedial hypothalamic nucleus; More reference expression data
BioGPS	More reference expression data
Gene ontology
Molecular function	cation:chloride symporter activity; chloride transmembrane transporter activity; transporter activity; symporter activity; protein kinase binding; potassium:chloride symporter activity
Cellular component	membrane; plasma membrane; integral component of plasma membrane; dendritic shaft; soma; integral component of membrane
Biological process	thermosensory behavior; multicellular organism growth; chloride transmembrane transport; learning; potassium ion transport; dendritic spine development; cellular chloride ion homeostasis; chloride transport; chemical synaptic transmission; transmembrane transport; potassium ion transmembrane transport; ion transport; cellular ion homeostasis; hypotonic response; cell volume homeostasis; chloride ion homeostasis; potassium ion homeostasis; potassium ion import across plasma membrane
Sources:Amigo / QuickGO
Orthologs
Databases	NCBI: entry; OMA: entry
Species	Human	Mouse
Entrez	57468	57138
Ensembl	ENSG00000124140	ENSMUSG00000017740
UniProt	Q9H2X9	Q91V14
RefSeq (mRNA)	NM_020708; NM_001134771	NM_020333; NM_001355480; NM_001355481
RefSeq (protein)	NP_001128243; NP_065759	NP_065066; NP_001342409; NP_001342410
Location (UCSC)	Chr 20: 46.02 – 46.06 Mb	Chr 2: 164.8 – 164.84 Mb
PubMed search
- Wikidata
View/Edit Human	View/Edit Mouse

Potassium-chloride transporter member 5 (aka: KCC2 and SLC12A5) is a neuron-specific chloride potassium symporter responsible for establishing the chloride ion gradient in neurons through the maintenance of low intracellular chloride concentrations. It is a critical mediator of synaptic inhibition, cellular protection against excitotoxicity and may also act as a modulator of neuroplasticity. Potassium-chloride transporter member 5 is also known by the names: KCC2 (potassium chloride cotransporter 2) for its ionic substrates, and SLC12A5 for its genetic origin from the SLC12A5 gene in humans.

Animals with reduced expression of this transporter exhibit severe motor deficits, epileptiform activity, and spasticity. KCC2 knockout animals, in which KCC2 is completely absent, die postnatally due to respiratory failure.

== Location ==
KCC2 is a neuron-specific membrane protein expressed throughout the central nervous system, including the hippocampus, hypothalamus, brainstem, and motoneurons of the ventral spinal cord.

At the subcellular level, KCC2 has been found in membranes of the somata and dendrites of neurons, with no evidence of expression on axons. KCC2 has also been shown to colocalize with GABA_{A} receptors, which serve as ligand-gated ion channels to allow chloride ion movement across the cell membrane. Under normal conditions, the opening of GABA_{A} receptors permits the hyperpolarizing influx of chloride ions to inhibit postsynaptic neurons from firing.

Counterintuitively, KCC2 has also been shown to colocalize at excitatory synapses. One suggested explanation for such colocalization is a potential protective role of KCC2 against excitotoxicity. Ion influx due to the excitatory synaptic stimulation of ion channels in the neuronal membrane causes osmotic swelling of cells as water is drawn in alongside the ions. KCC2 may help to eliminate excess ions from the cell in order to re-establish osmotic homeostasis.

== Structure ==
KCC2 is a member of the cation-chloride cotransporter (CCC) superfamily of proteins.

As with all CCC proteins, KCC2 is an integral membrane protein with 12 transmembrane domains and both N- and C-terminal cytoplasmic domains. The terminal cytoplasmic domains can be phosphorylated by kinases within the neuron for rapid regulation.

=== Two Isoforms: KCC2a, KCC2b ===
There are two isoforms of KCC2: KCC2a and KCC2b. The two isoforms arise from alternative promoters on the SLC12A5 gene and differential splicing of the first mRNA exon. The isoforms differ in their N-termini, with the KCC2a form constituting the larger of the two splice variants.

KCC2a levels remain relatively constant during pre- and postnatal development.

KCC2b, on the other hand, is scarcely present during prenatal development and is strongly upregulated during postnatal development. The upregulation of KCC2b expression is thought to be responsible for the "developmental shift" observed in mammals from depolarizing postsynaptic effects of inhibitory synapses in early neural networks to hyperpolarizing effects in mature neural networks.

KCC2b knockout mice can survive up to postnatal day 17 (P17) due to the presence of functional KCC2a alone, but they exhibit low body weight, motor deficits and generalized seizures. Complete KCC2 knockouts (both KCC2a and KCC2b absent) die after birth due to respiratory failure.

=== Oligomerization ===
Both KCC2 isoforms can form homomultimers, or heteromultimers with other K-Cl symporters on the cell membrane to maintain chloride homeostasis in neurons. Dimers, trimers, and tetramers involving KCC2 have been identified in brainstem neurons. Oligomerization may play an important role in transporter function and activation, as it has been observed that the oligomer to monomer ratio increases in correlation to the development of the chloride ion gradient in neurons.

== Developmental changes in expression ==
KCC2 levels are low during mammalian embryonic development, when neural networks are still being established and neurons are highly plastic (changeable). During this stage, intracellular chloride ion concentrations are high due to low KCC2 expression and high levels of a transporter known as NKCC1 (Na^{+}/K^{+} chloride cotransporter 1), which moves chloride ions into cells. Thus, during embryonic development, the chloride gradient is such that stimulation of GABA_{A} receptors and glycine receptors at inhibitory synapses causes chloride ions to flow out of cells, making the internal neuronal environment less negative (i.e. more depolarized) than it would be at rest. At this stage, GABA_{A} receptors and glycine receptors act as excitatory rather than inhibitory effectors on postsynaptic neurons, resulting in depolarization and hyperexcitability of neural networks.

During postnatal development, KCC2 levels are strongly upregulated while NKCC1 levels are down regulated. This change in expression correlates to a developmental shift of the chloride ion concentration within neurons from high to low intracellular concentration. Effectively, as the chloride ion concentration is reduced, the chloride gradient across the cellular membrane is reversed such that GABA_{A} receptor and glycine receptor stimulation causes chloride ion influx, making the internal neuronal environment more negative (i.e. more hyperpolarized) than it would be at rest. This is the developmental shift of inhibitory synapses from the excitatory postsynaptic responses of the early neural development phase to the inhibitory postsynaptic responses observed throughout maturity.

== Function ==
Current literature suggests that KCC2 serves three primary roles within neurons:

1. Establishing the chloride ion gradient necessary for postsynaptic inhibition
2. Protecting neuronal networks against stimulation-induced excitotoxicity
3. Contributing to dendritic spine morphogenesis and glutamatergic synaptic function

=== Postsynaptic inhibition ===
Reduced expression or functional impairment of KCC2 leads to elevated intracellular chloride levels, which weaken inhibitory GABAergic signalling and increase neuronal excitability, particularly in hippocampal circuits.

KCC2 is a potassium (K^{+})/chloride (Cl^{−}) symporter that maintains chloride homeostasis in neurons. The electrochemical chloride gradient established by KCC2 activity is crucial for classical postsynaptic inhibition through GABA_{A} receptors and glycine receptors in the central nervous system. KCC2 utilizes the potassium gradient generated by the Na^{+}/K^{+} pump to drive chloride extrusion from neurons. In fact, any disruption of the neuronal K^{+} gradient would indirectly affect KCC2 activity.

Loss of KCC2 following neuronal damage (e.g. ischemia, spinal cord damage, physical trauma to the central nervous system) results in the loss of inhibitory regulation and the subsequent development of neuronal hyperexcitability, motor spasticity, and seizure-like activity as GABA_{A} receptors and glycine receptors revert from hyperpolarizing to depolarizing postsynaptic effects.

=== Cellular protection ===
High levels of stimulation and subsequent ionic influx through activated ion channels can result in cellular swelling as osmotically-obliged water is drawn into neurons along with ionic solutes. This phenomenon is known as excitotoxicity. KCC2 has been shown to be activated by cell-swelling, and may therefore play a role in eliminating excess ions following periods of high stimulation in order to maintain steady-state neuronal volume and prevent cells from bursting.

This role may also account for the fact that KCC2 has been known to colocalize near excitatory synapses, even though its primary role is to establish the chloride gradient for postsynaptic inhibition.

=== Morphogenesis and function of glutamatergic synapses ===
In addition to controlling the efficacy of GABAergic synapses through chloride homeostasis, KCC2 play a critical role in the morphogenesis and function of glutamatergic synapses within the central nervous system. Studies on hippocampal tissue in KCC2 knockout animals showed that neurons lacking KCC2 have stunted dendritic growth and malformed dendritic spines. Recent studies demonstrate that KCC2 plays a critical role in the structure and function of dendritic spines which host most excitatory synapses in cortical neurons. Through an interaction with actin cytoskeleton, KCC2 forms a molecular barrier to the diffusion of transmembrane proteins within dendritic spines, thereby regulating the local confinement of AMPA receptors and synaptic potency.

It has been proposed that the downregulation of KCC2 observed following neuronal trauma, and the consequent depolarizing shift of GABA_{A}-mediated synapses, may be an aspect of neuronal de-differentiation. De-differentiation of damaged portions of the nervous system would allow for neuronal networks to return to higher levels of plasticity in order to rewire surviving neurons to compensate for damage in the network. In addition, reduced glutamatergic transmission upon KCC2 downregulation may serve as a homeostatic process to compensate for the reduced GABA transmission due to altered chloride extrusion.

=== Oncogenesis ===
Mutations in SLC12A5 are associated with colon cancer.

== Regulation ==
=== Transcriptional regulation: TrkB receptor signalling ===
KCC2 is transcriptionally downregulated following central nervous system injury by the TrkB receptor signalling transduction cascade (activated by BDNF and NT-4/5).

=== Post-translational regulation: phosphorylation ===
It is conventionally thought that phosphorylation inactivates or downregulates KCC2, however there is recent evidence to suggest that phosphorylation at different sites on the KCC2 protein determines different regulational outcomes:

- Wnk1/Wnk3 and tyrosine kinase (i.e. TrkB) phosphorylation downregulates KCC2 activity.
- PKC phosphorylation of the C-terminus Ser940 residue of the KCC2 protein upregulates KCC2 activity by increasing surface stability. Conversely, Ser940 dephosphorylation leads to enhanced membrane diffusion and endocytosis of KCC2.

KCC2 has an extremely high rate of turnover at the plasmalemma (minutes), suggesting that phosphorylation serves as the primary mechanism for rapid regulation.

=== Activity-dependent downregulation ===
KCC2 is downregulated by excitatory glutamate activity on NMDA receptor activity and Ca^{2+} influx. This process involves rapid dephosphorylation on Ser940 and calpain protease cleavage of KCC2, leading to enhanced membrane diffusion and endocytosis of the transporter, as demonstrated in experiments using single particle tracking.

Glutamate release occurs not only at excitatory synapses, but is also known to occur after neuronal damage or ischemic insult. Thus, activity-dependent downregulation may be the underlying mechanism by which KCC2 downregulation occurs following central nervous system injury.

== See also ==
- Solute carrier family
