= Chloride potassium symporter 4 =

Protein found in humans

SLC12A4

Identifiers
- Aliases: SLC12A4, KCC1, Chloride potassium symporter 4, CTC-479C5.17, hKCC1, solute carrier family 12 member 4
- External IDs: OMIM: 604119; MGI: 1309465; GeneCards: SLC12A4

Gene location (Human)
Chr.	Chromosome 16 (human)
Band	16q22.1	Start	67,943,474 bp
Band	16q22.1	End	67,969,601 bp

Gene location (Mouse)
Chr.	Chromosome 8 (mouse)
Band	8 D3|8 53.06 cM	Start	106,670,222 bp
Band	8 D3|8 53.06 cM	End	106,692,729 bp
RNA expression pattern
Bgee	Human / Mouse (ortholog); Top expressed in: apex of heart; ascending aorta; stromal cell of endometrium; body of uterus; Descending thoracic aorta; right coronary artery; left lobe of thyroid gland; left coronary artery; tibial nerve; tibial arteries / Top expressed in: choroid plexus of fourth ventricle; molar; Epithelium of choroid plexus; lip; ankle; stroma of bone marrow; body of femur; yolk sac; sciatic nerve; calvaria; More reference expression data
BioGPS	n/a
Gene ontology
Molecular function	cation:chloride symporter activity; symporter activity; transporter activity; protein kinase binding; potassium:chloride symporter activity
Cellular component	lysosomal membrane; plasma membrane; membrane; integral component of membrane; integral component of plasma membrane
Biological process	ion transport; chemical synaptic transmission; cell volume homeostasis; potassium ion transport; potassium ion transmembrane transport; transmembrane transport; chloride transmembrane transport; chloride transport; transport; chloride ion homeostasis; potassium ion homeostasis; potassium ion import across plasma membrane
Sources:Amigo / QuickGO
Orthologs
Databases	NCBI: entry; OMA: entry
Species	Human	Mouse
Entrez	6560	20498
Ensembl	ENSG00000124067	ENSMUSG00000017765
UniProt	Q9UP95	Q9JIS8
RefSeq (mRNA)	NM_005072; NM_001145961; NM_001145962; NM_001145963; NM_001145964	NM_001253804; NM_009195
RefSeq (protein)	NP_001139433; NP_001139434; NP_001139435; NP_001139436; NP_005063	NP_001240733; NP_033221
Location (UCSC)	Chr 16: 67.94 – 67.97 Mb	Chr 8: 106.67 – 106.69 Mb
PubMed search
- Wikidata
View/Edit Human	View/Edit Mouse

Potassium-chloride transporter, member 4 is a chloride potassium symporter protein. It is encoded by the gene SLC12A4.

== See also ==
- Solute carrier family
