= Large neutral amino acids transporter small subunit 1 =

Protein-coding gene in the species Homo sapiens

SLC7A5

Identifiers
- Aliases: SLC7A5, 4F2LC, CD98, D16S469E, E16, LAT1, MPE16, hLAT1, solute carrier family 7 member 5
- External IDs: OMIM: 600182; MGI: 1298205; GeneCards: SLC7A5

Gene location (Human)
Chr.	Chromosome 16 (human)
Band	16q24.2	Start	87,830,023 bp
Band	16q24.2	End	87,869,507 bp

Gene location (Mouse)
Chr.	Chromosome 8 (mouse)
Band	8 E1|8	Start	122,607,889 bp
Band	8 E1|8	End	122,634,433 bp
RNA expression pattern
Bgee	Human / Mouse (ortholog); Top expressed in: retinal pigment epithelium; beta cell; dorsal motor nucleus of vagus nerve; mucosa of pharynx; inferior olivary nucleus; mucosa of esophagus; body of tongue; corpus epididymis; left testis; right testis / Top expressed in: lacrimal gland; fetal liver hematopoietic progenitor cell; lens; seminal vesicula; spermatocyte; calvaria; optic nerve; parotid gland; seminiferous tubule; blood; More reference expression data
BioGPS	n/a
Gene ontology
Molecular function	peptide antigen binding; L-amino acid transmembrane transporter activity; amino acid transmembrane transporter activity; neutral amino acid transmembrane transporter activity; antiporter activity; protein binding; transmembrane transporter activity
Cellular component	integral component of membrane; membrane; intracellular membrane-bounded organelle; plasma membrane; apical plasma membrane; extracellular exosome; integral component of plasma membrane; cytoplasm; cytosol
Biological process	amino acid transmembrane transport; cell differentiation; cellular amino acid metabolic process; nervous system development; multicellular organism development; L-amino acid transport; neutral amino acid transport; leukocyte migration; amino acid transport; L-alpha-amino acid transmembrane transport; transport; transmembrane transport
Sources:Amigo / QuickGO
Orthologs
Databases	NCBI: entry; OMA: entry
Species	Human	Mouse
Entrez	8140	20539
Ensembl	ENSG00000103257	ENSMUSG00000040010
UniProt	Q01650	Q9Z127
RefSeq (mRNA)	NM_003486	NM_011404
RefSeq (protein)	NP_003477	NP_035534
Location (UCSC)	Chr 16: 87.83 – 87.87 Mb	Chr 8: 122.61 – 122.63 Mb
PubMed search
- Wikidata
View/Edit Human	View/Edit Mouse

Large neutral amino acids transporter small subunit 1, also known as 4F2 light chain, or CD98 light chain is a protein that in humans is encoded by the SLC7A5 gene.

== See also ==
- Heterodimeric amino acid transporter
