= SMIM19 =

Protein-coding gene in the species Homo sapiens

Identifiers
- Aliases: SMIM19, C8orf40, small integral membrane protein 19
- External IDs: MGI: 2142501; GeneCards: SMIM19

Gene location (Human)
Chr.	Chromosome 8 (human)
Band	8p11.21	Start	42,541,155 bp
Band	8p11.21	End	42,555,195 bp

Gene location (Mouse)
Chr.	Chromosome 8 (mouse)
Band	8|8 A2	Start	22,952,630 bp
Band	8|8 A2	End	22,966,898 bp
RNA expression pattern
Bgee	Human / Mouse (ortholog); Top expressed in: parotid gland; myocardium of left ventricle; bronchial epithelial cell; tibialis anterior muscle; olfactory zone of nasal mucosa; cardiac muscle tissue of right atrium; skin of arm; deltoid muscle; vastus lateralis muscle; biceps brachii / Top expressed in: interventricular septum; parotid gland; muscle of thigh; brown adipose tissue; quadriceps femoris muscle; thoracic diaphragm; gastrocnemius muscle; digastric muscle; skeletal muscle tissue; intercostal muscle; More reference expression data
BioGPS	n/a
Orthologs
Databases	NCBI: entry; OMA: entry
Species	Human	Mouse
Entrez	114926	102032
Ensembl	ENSG00000176209	ENSMUSG00000031534
UniProt	Q96E16	Q80ZU4
RefSeq (mRNA)	NM_001135674; NM_001135675; NM_001135676; NM_138436; NM_001363186	NM_001012667; NM_001146117
RefSeq (protein)	NP_001129146; NP_001129147; NP_001129148; NP_612445; NP_001350115	NP_001012685; NP_001139589
Location (UCSC)	Chr 8: 42.54 – 42.56 Mb	Chr 8: 22.95 – 22.97 Mb
PubMed search
- Wikidata
View/Edit Human	View/Edit Mouse

SMIM19, also known as Small Integral Membrane Protein 19, encodes the SMIM19 protein. SMIM19 is a confirmed single-pass transmembrane protein passing from outside to inside, 5' to 3' respectively. SMIM19 has ubiquitously high to medium expression with among varied tissues or organs. The validated function of SMIM19 remains under review because of on sub-cellular localization uncertainty. However, all linked proteins research to interact with SMIM19 are associated with the endoplasmic reticulum (ER), presuming SMIM19 ER association

== Gene ==
SMIM19 is also commonly known and referenced as C8orf40 (chromosome 8 open reading frame 40). SMIM19 also has a few other lesser known names, such as LOC114926, Doyzeeby, and Beeveybu. The SMIM19 gene is located on the plus strand at 8p11.21 in humans. The SMIM19 gene is composed of 4 total exons and spanning 14.04 kb from 42,541,155 bp to 42,555,193 bp. The upstream neighboring gene to SMIM19 is SLC20A2.

== Transcripts ==
=== Variants ===
There are four validate transcript variants for SMIM19 that all encode the same protein, as they only differ in sequence within the 5' UTR. Transcript variant 1 represents the longest transcript

Transcript Variants of SMIM19
Transcript Variant	RefSeq Accession	Length	Description	Number of Exons
Transcript Variant 1	NM_001135674.2	3704 bp	Ecodes Isoform 1	4
Transcript Variant 2	NM_001135675.2	3486 bp	Ecodes Isoform 1; Lacks portion of 5' UTR	4
Transcript Variant 3	NM_138436.4	3036 bp	Ecodes Isoform 1; Lacks portion of 5' UTR	4
Transcript Variant 4	NM_001135676.2	2967 bp	Ecodes Isoform 1; Lacks portion of 5' UTR	4

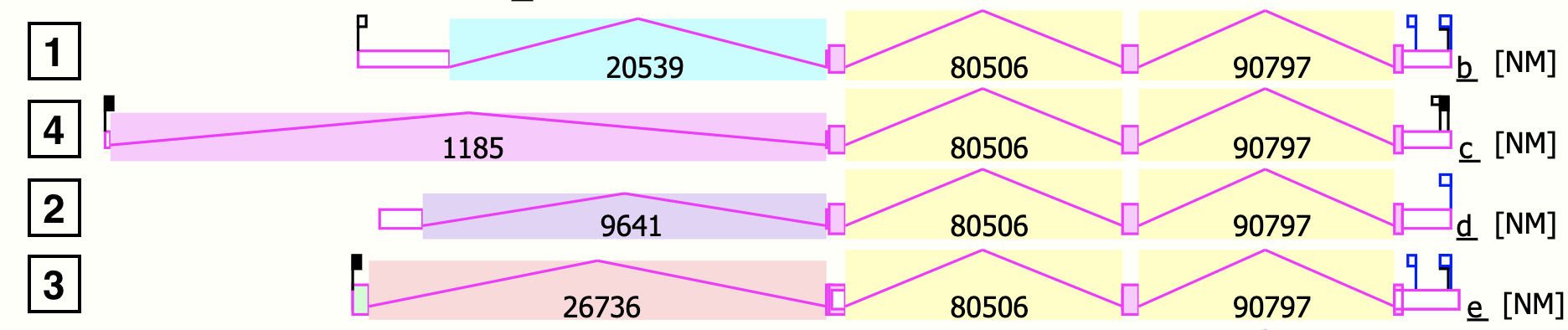
SMIM19 Transcript Variants 1–4, retrieved from AceView.

=== Features ===
The SMIM19 mRNA is composed of one major polyadenylation sequence and site combination and three alternative ones, along with an upstream in-frame stop codon. Not all variants contain the upstream in-frame stop codon as it is present in the portion of the 5' UTR that varies. The polyadenylation sequences and site are consistent among all transcript variants.

== Protein ==
=== Isoforms ===
There is only one validated SMIM19 protein isoform that is encoded by all four transcript variants. It is 107 amino acids long with a molecular weight of 12.44 kDa. The isoelectric point varies among SMIM19 organism and shows a pattern based on taxonomical group, likely due to post-modification variations between taxonomical group

Isoelectric Point Taxonomical Pattern
Organism	Taxonomical Group	Isoelectric Point (pH)
Homo sapiens	Mammal	5.3
Mus Musculus	Mammal	5.62
Danio rerio	Fish	5.78
Xenopus tropicalis	Amphibian	6.08
Trachemys scripta elegans	Reptile	7.97
Gopherus evgoodei	Reptile	7.97
Gallus gallus	Bird	9.34
Taeniopygia guttata	Bird	9

=== Amino Acid Composition ===
The SMIM19 protein contains a validated transmembrane region. There is no indication that SMIM19 is rich or poor in any amino acid; no amino acid or combination of amino acids were outside of the standard deviation in relation to abundance. There was no significance detected with the spacing of cysteines as SMIM19 contains none. Similarly, there were no repetitive structures i.e., separated, tandem or periodic repeats, found in SMIM19 protein sequence

==== Transmembrane/ Hydrophobic Region ====
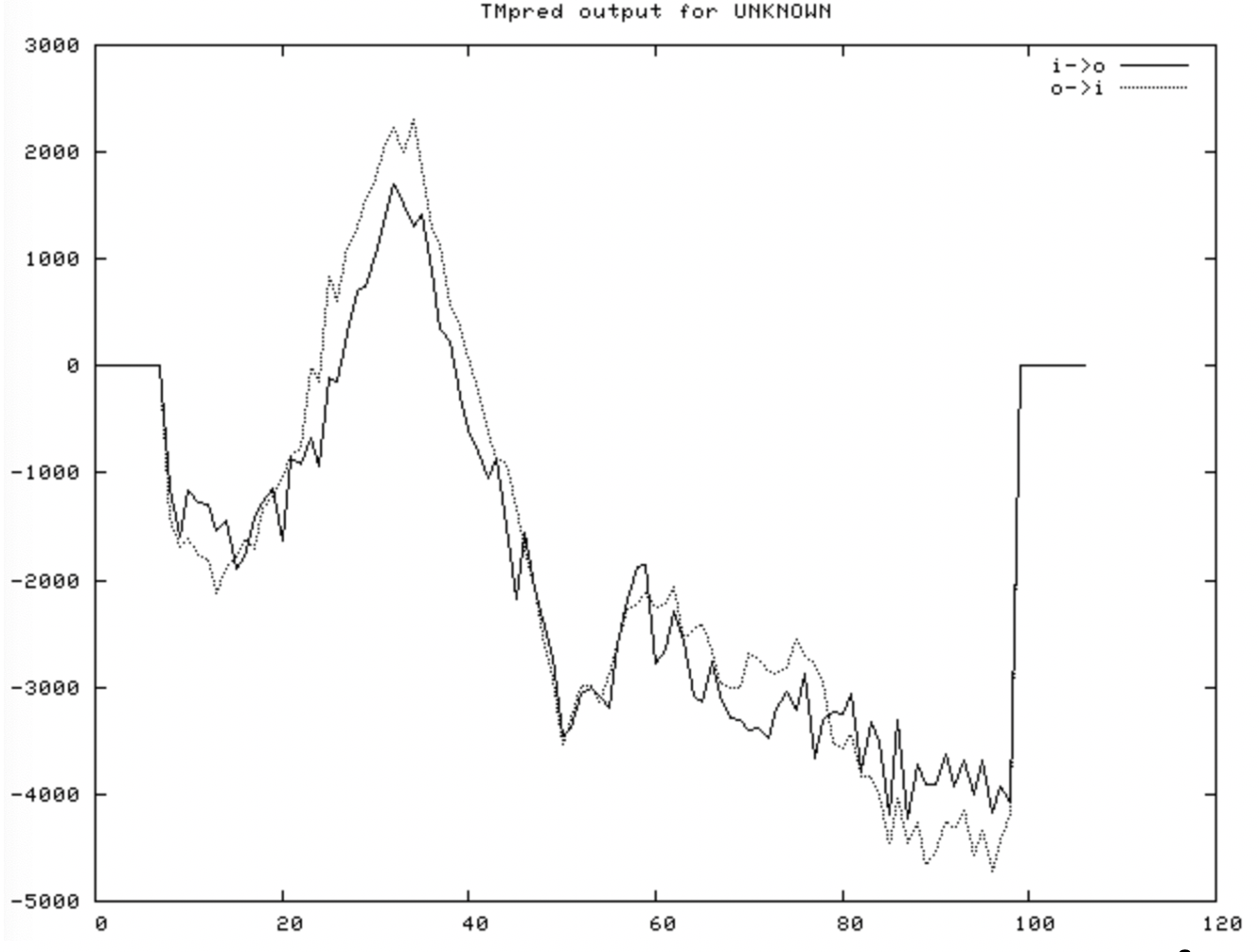
TMpred graphic output for SMIM19 Homo sapiens protein sequence.

The SMIM19 protein contains a transmembrane region, which is also considered a hydrophobic region that spans 19 amino acids. The right a TMpred output predicted orientation analysis of the SMIM19 protein demonstrates that the protein is likely oriented outside to inside, which was used to structure the TOPO2 diagram.

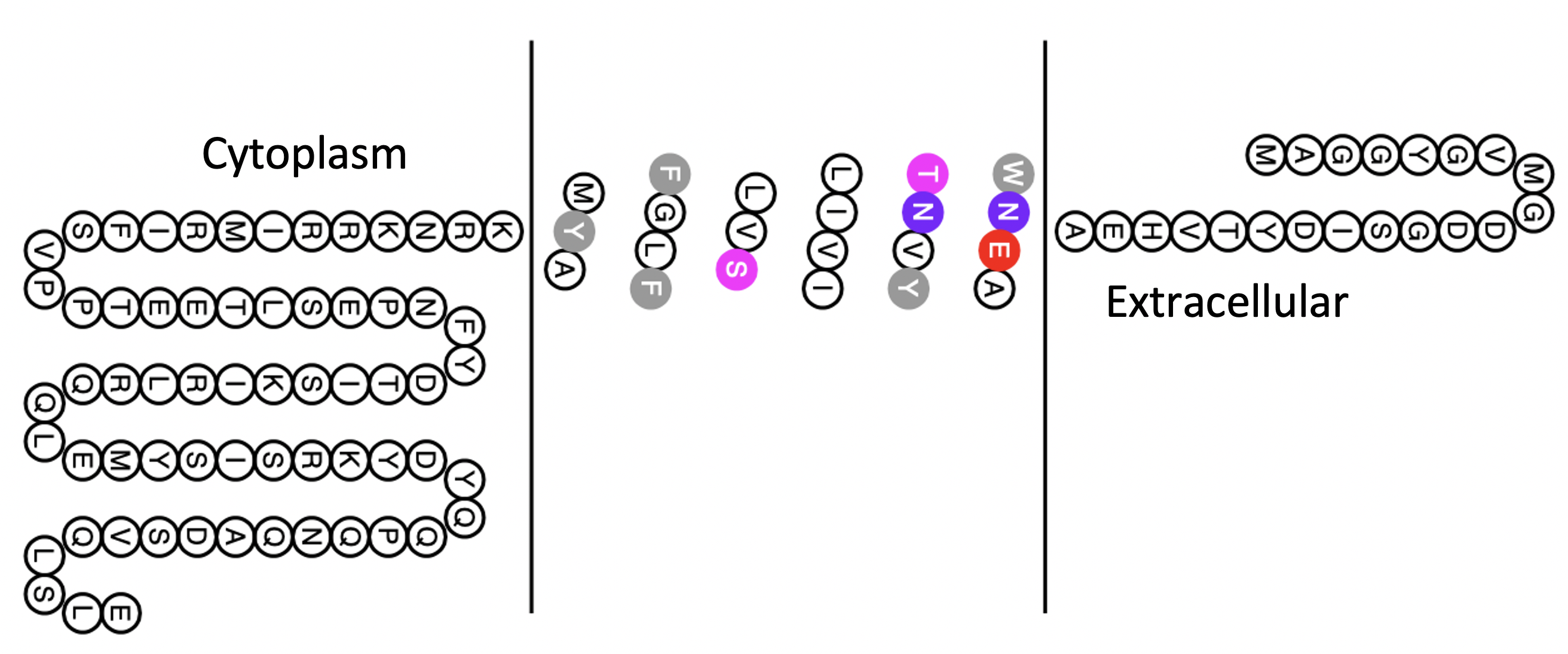
SMIM19 Transmembrane Domain Display, retrieved from TOPO2

==== Positive Amino Acid Run ====
Consistent with the majority of SMIM19 homologs, there is a positive amino acid run almost immediately following the transmembrane region: KRR (Lysine, Arginine, Arginine).

=== Motifs ===
There were four matches for motifs with the SMIM19 sequence that are predicted to be significant. Casein kinase 2 can play a role in cell cycle regulation, DNA repair, and necessary for cell survival; down-regulation of Casein kinase 2 can promote tumorigenesis. Protein kinase C is a protein-regulator and is highly involved in various signaling cascades. Dendritic Cells- Specific Transmembrane Protein (DC-STAMP) is a seven- pass transmembrane protein specifically found in dendritic cells, often associated with immunological functions. Based on Eukaryotic Linear Motif predictions, there are strong sequence matches for cleavage site motifs following the transmembrane region, which also remain consistent among orthologs

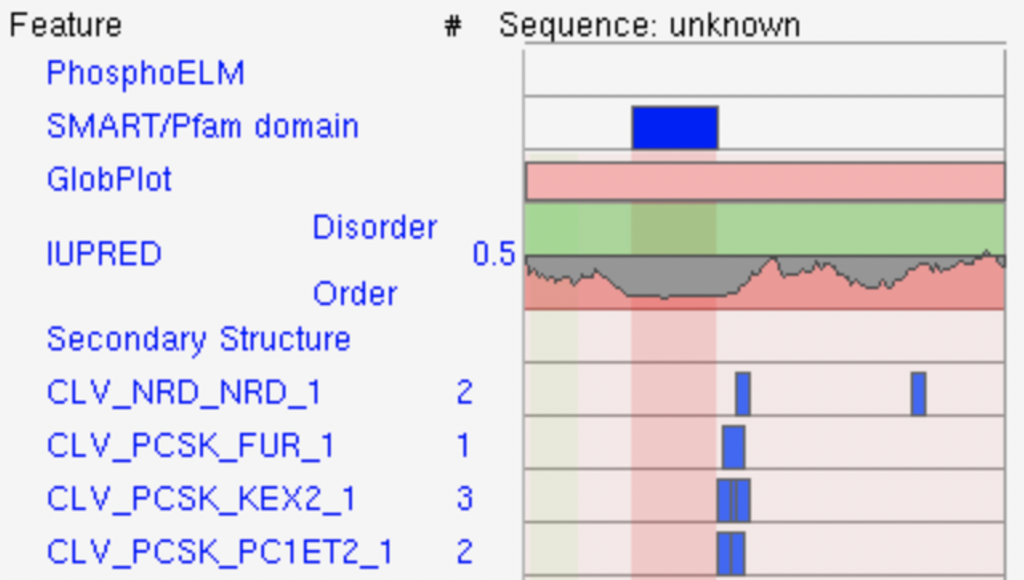
Eukaryotic Linear Motif SMIM19 predicted cleavage sites

Motif Sequence Matches with SMIM19 Protein
Motif Name	Abbreviation	Amino Acid Position	Amino Acid Sequence
Casein kinase II phosphorylation site	CK2_PHOSPHO_SITE	17-20	TVHE
Casein kinase II phosphorylation site	CK2_PHOSPHO_SITE	62-65	TVHE
Protein kinase C phosphorylation site	PKC_PHOSPHO_SITE	87-89	SRK
DC-STAMP-like protein	DC_STAMP	31-54	IVILVSFGLFMYAKRNNKRRIMRIF

=== Secondary Structure ===
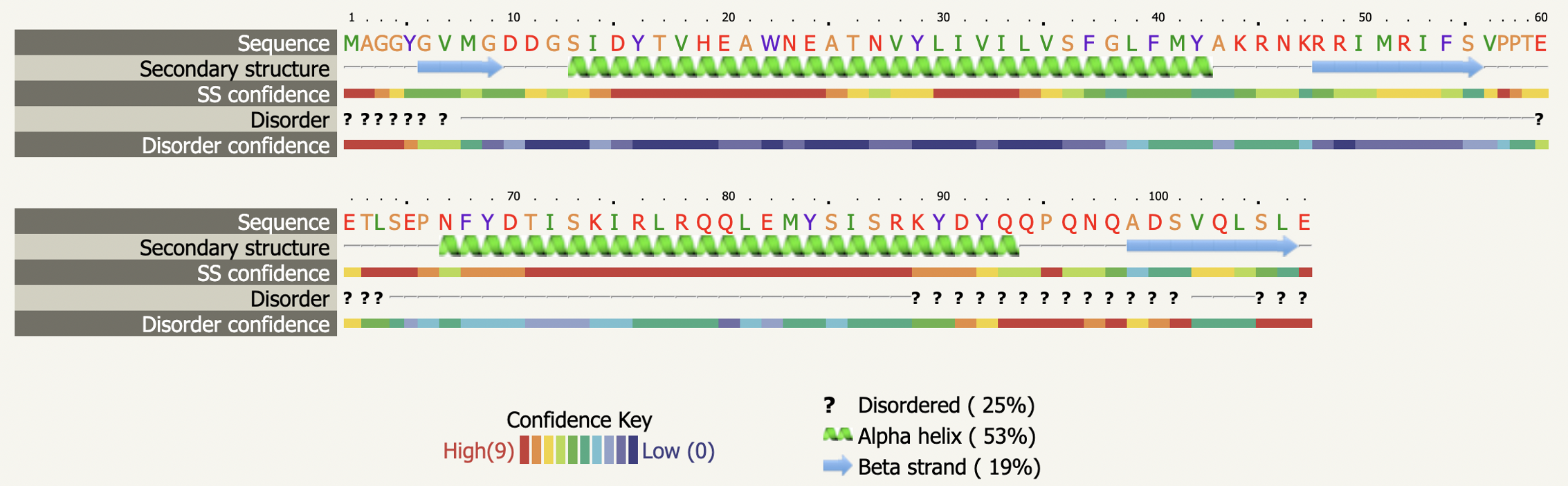
Phyre2 predicted SMIM19 protein structure

Based on ALI2D and Phyr2 (diagram pictured) data, it is determined that an alpha helix is likely present at the beginning of the sequence right before the transmembrane sequence with high confidence analysis. The transmembrane region structure following this first alpha helix, varies in structure per program used for analysis, so no conclusions could be made. The second beta sheet is consistent amongst various programs, and is likely a strong candidate for prediction. Following this, the large alpha helix predicted remains fairly consistent through all orthologs with high confidence from both Pyre2 and ALI2D. The end beta sheet is consistent between program analyses and predictions but remains in low confidence, so no definitive conclusions could be made.

=== Tertiary Structure ===
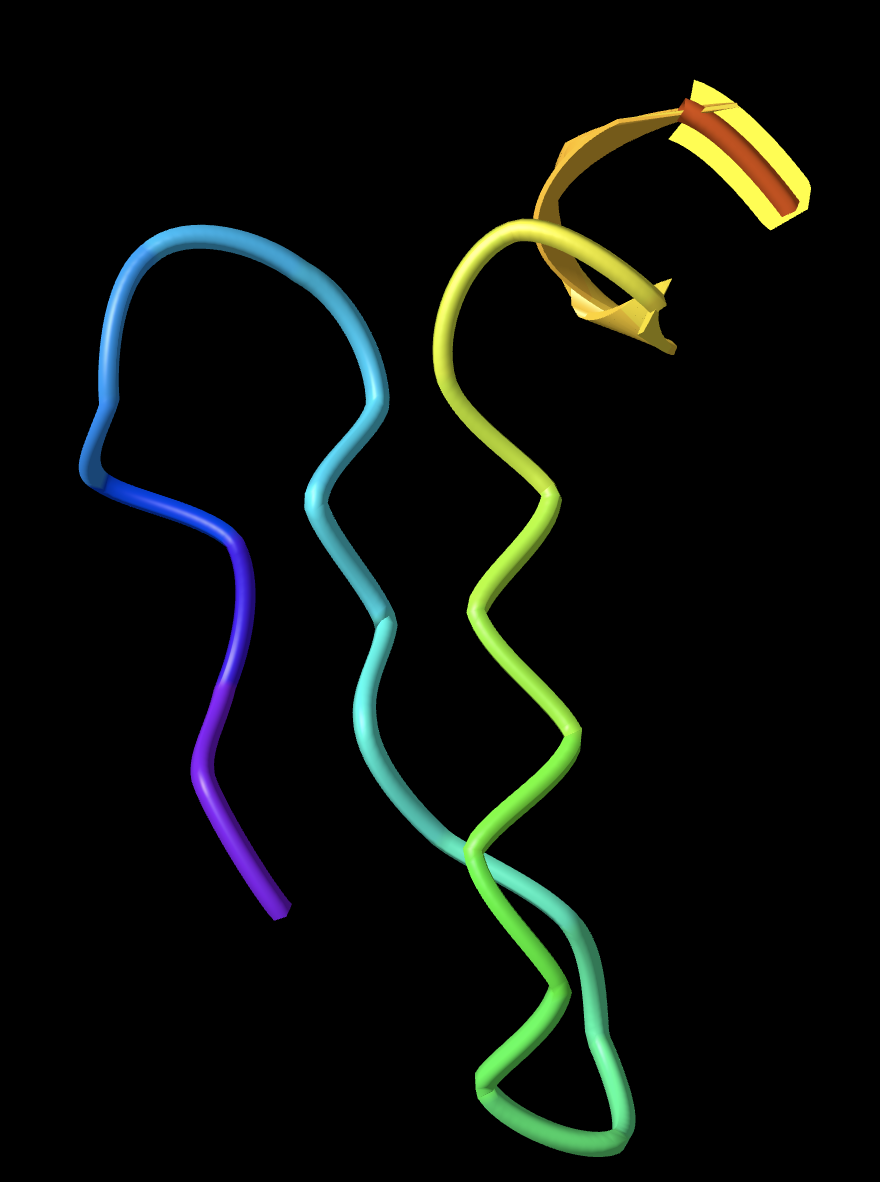
I-TASSER SMIM19 upstream sequence tertiary prediction

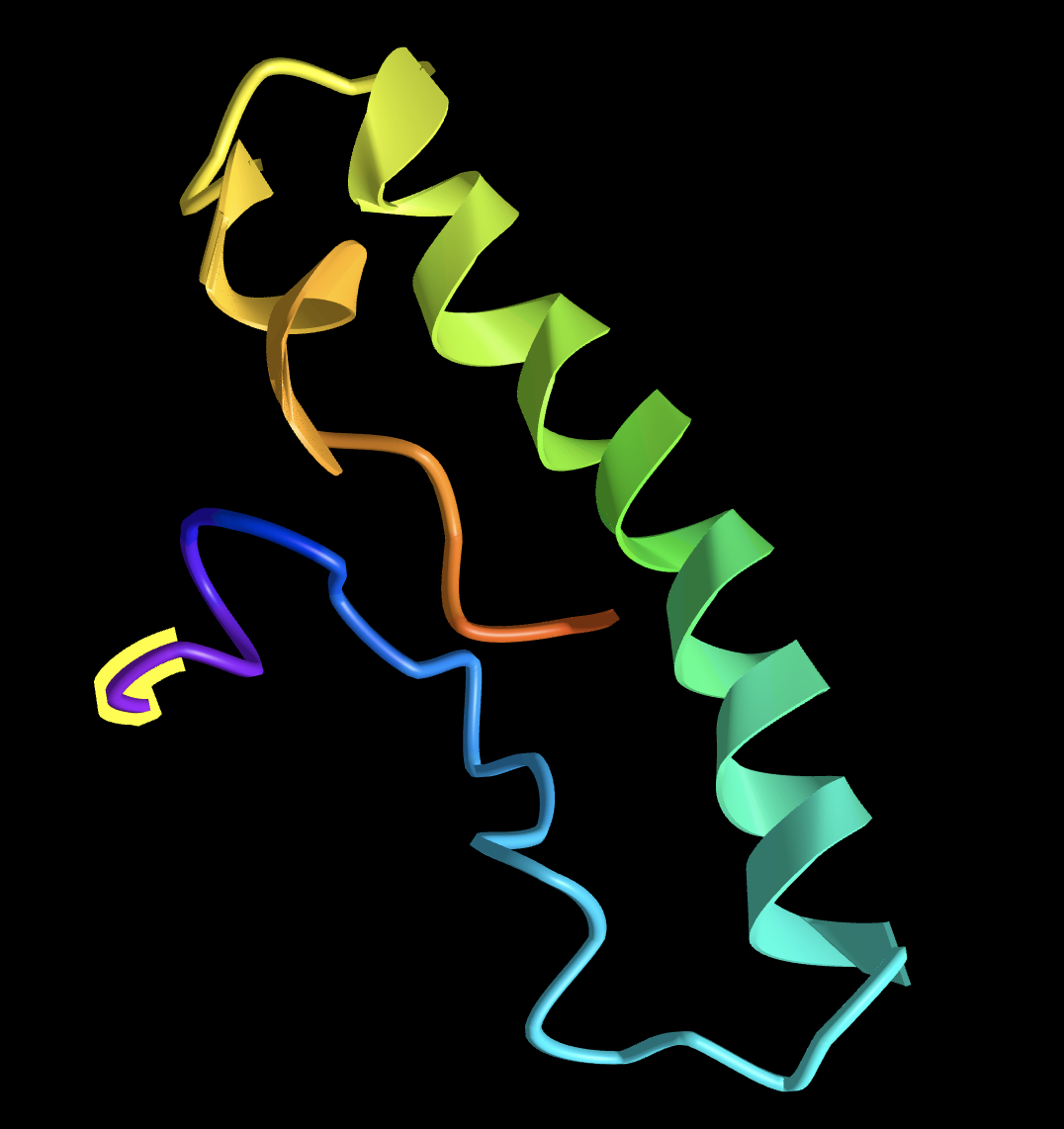
I-TASSER SMIM19 downstream sequence tertiary prediction

I-Tasser results of both the SMIM19 upstream and down stream sequence to the transmembrane domain (pictured left and right respectively) were analyzed with iCn3D. The SMIM19 protein is analyzed as a whole cause the cytosolic and extracellular sequence flanking the transmembrane domain attempt to coil together, producing a false predicted 3D structure as they should never interact being there is a membrane between them. Therefore, each upstream and downstream sequences was analyzed separately. Within each diagram there is a yellow highlighted section where the transmembrane sequence would meet each respective sequence. No strong conclusions can be made about SMIM19 tertiary structure beyond a large alpha helix present in the downstream sequence to the transmembrane region, consistent with Ali2D and Phyr2 results above

== Regulation and Expression ==
=== Gene-level Regulation ===
==== Promoter ====
The most conserved promoter among SMIM19 orthologs was GXP_9002686 on the positive strand spanning 1962 bp, located between 42,540,128 and 42,542,089. It is also supported by the greatest number of transcripts.

Unique Promoter Results for SMIM19
Promoter ID	Size (bp)	Start	End	Strand	Number of Transcripts
GXP_9002686	1962	42540128	42542089	+	10
GXP_2059777	1047	42540148	42541194	+	1
GXP_9526567	1040	42542605	42543644	+	0
GXP_9526568	1040	42544248	42545287	+	0
GXP_3212481	1206	42545262	42546467	+	1
GXP_9526569	1040	42547364	42548403	+	0

==== Transcription factors ====
The below selected transcription factors were chosen based on conservation among species first, and then further parsed for high matrix similarity and high number of proposed binding sites with in an extended SMIM19 promoter region. Conservation was highest further that desired from transcription start site.

SMIM19 Transcription Factors
Transcription factor	Description	Strand	Matrix similarity	Sequence
FKHD	Fork head domain factors	+	1	caaaaaaAACAaaacaa
FKHD	Fork head domain factors	+	1	caaaaaaAACAaaacaa
FKHD	Fork head domain factors	+	0.999	gcccggcAAACaatcag
PIT1	GHF-1 pituitary specific POU domain transcription factor	+	0.953	tatataaatACATataaat
HOMF	Homeodomain transcription factor	+	0.995	gtgagttTAATtgtaacag
CART	Cart-1 (catrilage homeoprotein 1)	+	0.995	gagttTAATtgtaacagatga
HBOX	Homeobx transcription factors	+	0.944	gacttatAATTaccagtca
DLXF	Disral-less homeodomain transcription factors	-	0.989	gctgactggtAATTataag
HOXF	Paralog hox genes 1-8 from the four hox clusters A, B, C, D	+	0.985	acttctaATTAccagtcag
LHXF	Lim homeodomain factors	-	0.979	tatacatttTGATtaagttctct
CAAT	CCAAT binding factors	+	0.926	ccagCCACtgacatc
OTC1	Octamer binding protein	+	0.992	cctATGCaaattcat
BRNF	Bm Pou domain factors	-	0.982	cttgacctaagTAATgaat
CART	Cart-1 (catrilage homeoprotein 1)	-	0.995	ttattTAATtgtgtagtgact
ARID	AT rich interactive domain factor	+	0.985	taaaAATAcccaaaagggact
FKHD	Fork head domain factors	+	1	ttttgaaAACActacgg
NR2F	Nuclear receptor subfamily 2 factors	+	0.904	cctggtgggaCAATgtacacgaccc
NKXH	Nkx homeodomain factors	+	0.986	cagcgTGAGtgbccccgcg
MYBL	Cellular and Viral myb-like transcriptional regulators	-	0.957	gggccgccgCAACtggcccgt
ETSF	Human and murine ETS1 factors	-	0.991	ctctcccaGGAAgcagcccgg

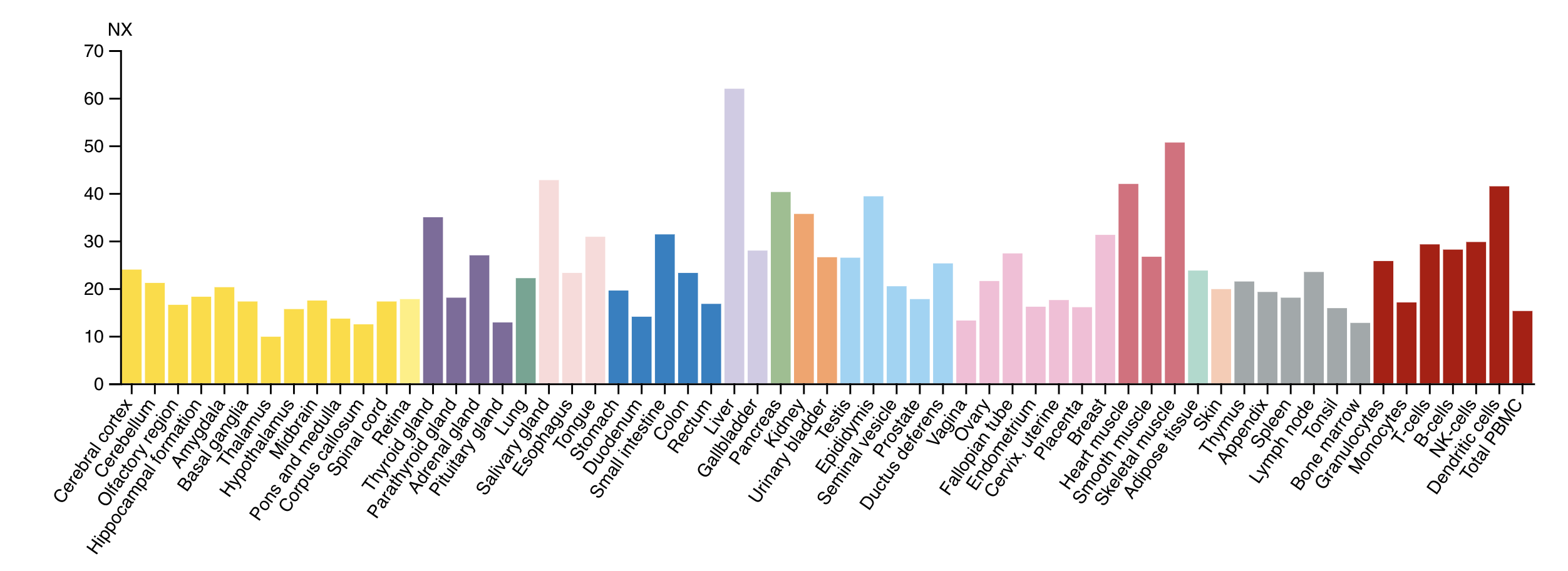
Human Protein Atlas SMIM19 RNA Expression Overview

==== Expression Patterns ====
According to RNA-seq data from Human Protein Atlas, SMIM19 has ubiquitously medium to high expression in all tissues with low specificity. Comparatively, there is higher expression in liver, muscle, some glandular tissue, and various immune cells. Expression in the brain is comparatively consistently lower.

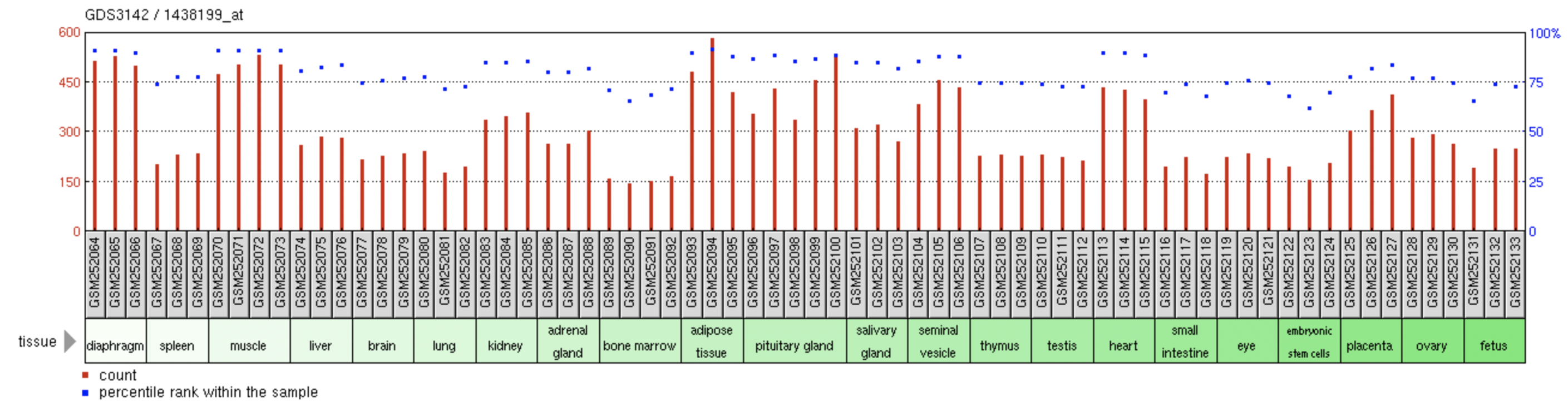
ChIP data for SMIM19 in Mus musculus

Chromatin Immunoprecipitation (ChIP) data for SMIM19 in mice even more confidently display ubiquitously medium to high expression in tissue; No tissue seems to fall below the 50 percentile rank for expression. Muscle tissue has high expression in mice as well. Adipose tissue and diaphragm tissue uniquely are high in expression comparatively. in situ hybridization data of SMIM19 expression in sagittal sectioning of whole embryos produced no definitive conclusions. No significantly abnormal cellular expression were observed. SMIM19 appears to be uniformly expressed.

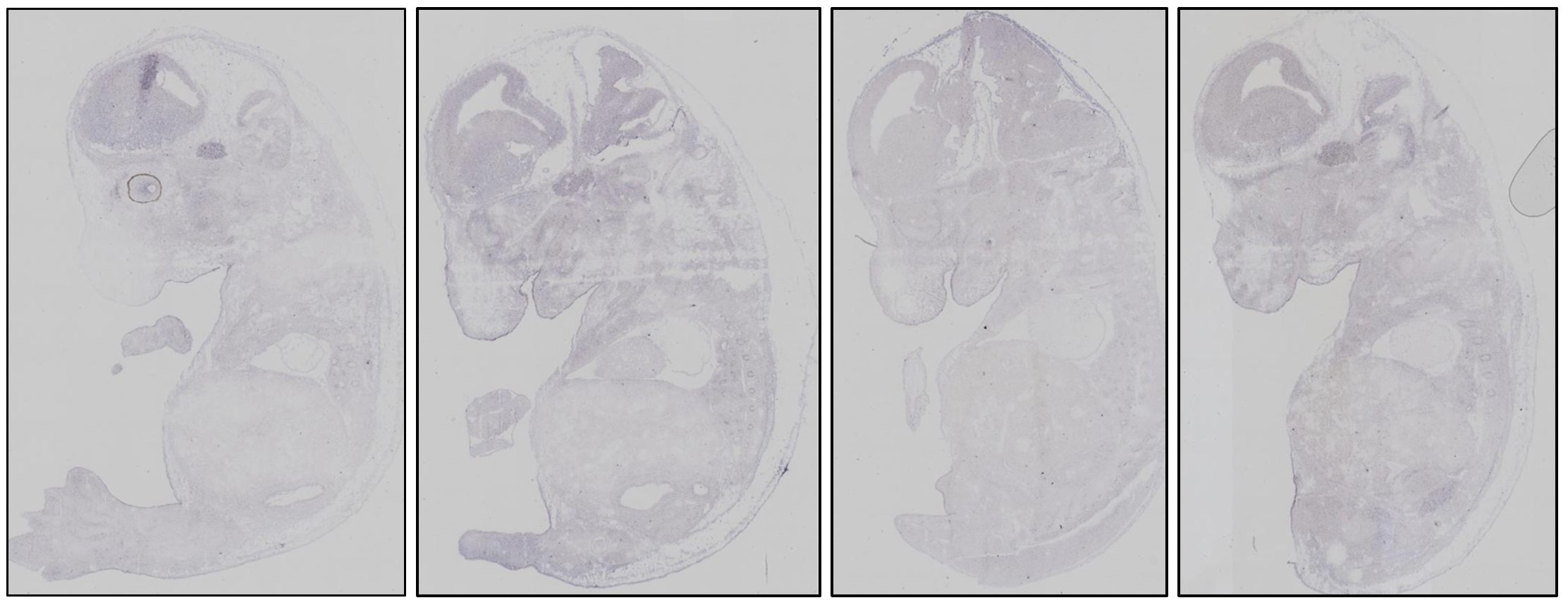
Genepaint full mouse embryo ISH

=== Transcript-level Regulation ===
==== miRNA binding sites ====
Hsa-miR-1206 and hsa-miR-433-3p were both highly ranked microRNAs in reference to predicted sequence matching with SMIM19 transcript. Each position and predicted sequence pairing is displayed in the image below.

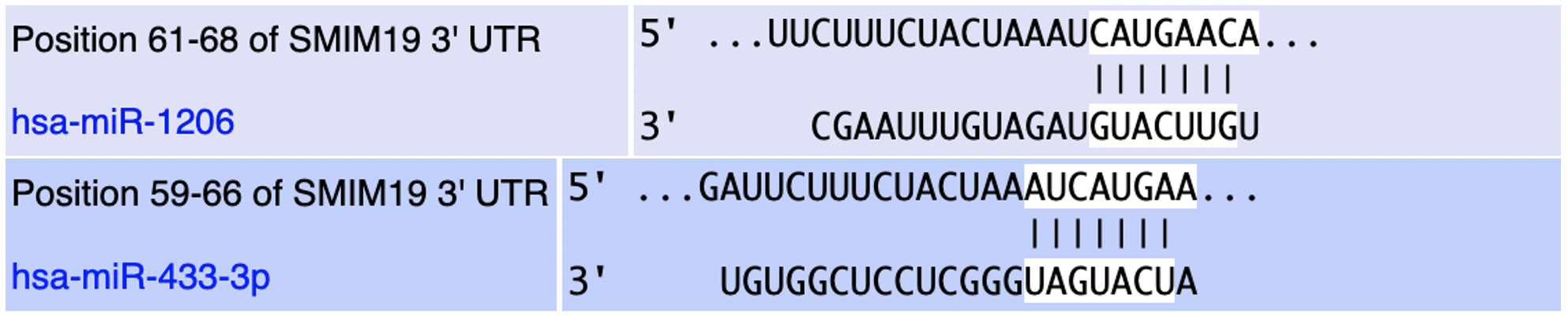
Target Scan MicroRNA Matches

==== mRNA-binding proteins ====
The tables below represent the most significant RNA-binding proteins based on relevancy and match score to the SMIM19 5’ UTR and 3’ UTR. Selection was not based on conserved sequence observed between orthologs being there is little conservation of the SMIM19 5’ and 3’ UTR outside of mammals.

SMIM19 5' UTR Selected RNA-binding Protein Predictions
RBP Name	Full Name	Score	Relative Score	Transcript Position	Matching Sequence	Summary
SFRS1	splicing factor, arginine/serine-rich 1	10.87	100%	413-419	ACGCGCA	Protein can activate or repress splicing; regulator of splicing
FUS	fused in sarcoma	7.37	100%	771-774	GGUG	Part of a complex involved on pre-mRNA splicing and export of mRNA to the cytoplasm
EIF4B	eukaryotic translation factor 4B	8.05	88%	431-437	GCGGAAA	Protein required for binding og mRNA to ribosomes
sap-49	spliceosome associated protein	7.56	86%	120-125	GCGUGA	Involved in various pre-mRNA splicing complexes
ZRANB2	zinc finger, RAN-binding domain containing 2	8.39	81%	27-32	CGGUAA	Protein is a splicing factor required for alternative splicing of specific transcripts

SMIM19 3' UTR Selected RNA-binding Protein Predictions
RBP Name	Full Name	Score	Relative Score	Transcript Position	Matching Sequence	Summary
SNRPA	small nuclear ribonucleoprotein polypeptide A	11.95	100%	1995-2001	AUUGCAC	Associates with a protein to bind 5' splice site of precursor mRNAs; required for splicing
NONO	non-POU domain containing, octomer-binding	8.95	100%	1491-1495	AGGGA	Plays a role in transcriptional regulation and RNA splicing
PABPC1	poly(A) binding protein, cytoplasmic 1	8.72	100%	1388-1392	AAAAA	Protein shuttles between nucleus and cytoplasm and binds 3' poly(A) tail of eukaryotic messenger RNA
RBMY1A1	RNA binding motif protein, Y-linked, family 1, member A1	8.67	100%	2149-2153	CUCAA	Functions as a splicing regulator
a2bp1	Fox-1 homolog A (Ataxin 2-binding protein 1)	8.65	100%	906-910	GCAUG	Regulates tissue-specific alternative splicing

==== Secondary structure ====
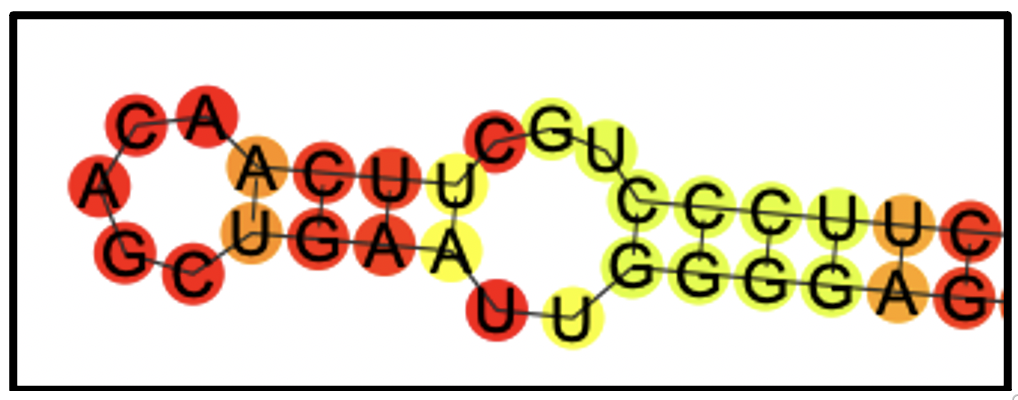
RNAfold predicted 3' UTR significant stem and loop

Large variation in SMIM19 5' UTR between variants within Homo sapiens and orthologs, makes secondary structure of possible regulation site fairly unreliable.

Relatively consistent 3' UTR produced one conserved stem-loop structure (pictured on right). With such a long SMIM19 3' UTR, a predicted secondary structure is improbable.

=== Protein-level Regulation ===
==== Sub-cellular Localization ====
There is much uncertainty in the SMIM19 sub-cellular localization.

Analyzed as a whole protein, SMIM19 is predicted as type 1b for membrane topology meaning it does not have a cleavable signal sequence but does have a transmembrane segment but not located near the C-terminus. Type 1b proteins favor localization at the ER. With high discrepancy of the localization of SMIM19 between nuclear or cytoplasmic, the Homo sapiens protein with majority ortholog confirmation is predicted to be a cytoplasmic protein.

Being there may be a cleavage site and signal sequence after the transmembrane sequence, SMIM19 analysis of the C-terminus and N-terminus separately produced varying results. The N-terminus is suggested to be located within the cytoplasm and have the same membrane topology as described above. The C-terminus is shown to have a mitochondrial targeting sequence and predicted to localize at the mitochondria

==== Post-translational Modifications ====
High scoring values with low p-values provide confidence in the prediction of interactions to both the phosphorylation site and SUMO Interaction site with SMIM19. A SUMO interaction matched with a short sequence within the SMIM19 transmembrane region, likely meaning it is involved in the degradation process of the protein as that would likely be the only time SMIM19 is removed from the membrane resulting in the sit being exposed.

With high confidence via Myristolator, it is predicted that SMIM19 is created and cut to reveal the 4th glycine as the n-terminal glycine. This was determined with a 24 positive to 1 negative average response to neural networks with a confidence level of 0.855 where high is greater than 0.85 and less than 1. As the first three glycine predicted non-myristylation 0:25, positive: negative respectfully. This adds to the conclusion that SMIM19 protein is membrane associated.

SMIM19 Post-Translational Modification Predications
Post-Modification Type	Amino Acid Position	Peptide	Score	P-value
SUMO Interaction	30-34	LIVIL	51.39	0.017
Sumoylation Nonconcensus	89	K	5.8	0.052
Phosphorylation Site	13	S	40.04	N/A

== Homology and Evolution ==
=== Paralogs ===
There are no paralogs of SMIM19 currently present in the human genome.

=== Orthologs ===
The oldest known ancestors of SMIM19 are invertebrates; invertebrates are the most distant homologs of SMIM19 detectable. No homologs of SMIM19 were evolutionarily found past Invertebrates; the gene is not found in plants, bacteria, etc. The gene is also not present in the Insecta class, within the invertebrates.

Selected SMIM19 Orthologs
Genus species	Common name	Taxonomical Group	Accession #	Date of Divergence from Human Lineage (MYA)	Sequence length (amino acids)	Sequence identity to human protein	Sequence similarity to Human Protein
Homo sapiens	Human	Mammalia	NP_001129147	N/A	107	100%	100%
Mus musculus	House Mouse	Mammalia	NP_001012685	90	112	82%	90%
Gopherus evgoodei	Goode's Thronscrub Tortoise	Reptilia	XP_030421196	312	115	65%	77%
Gallus gallus	Chicken	Aves	NP_001183985	312	118	59%	75%
Taeniopygia guttata	Zebra Finch	Aves	XP_030127447	312	122	59%	72%
Trachemys scripta elegans	Red-Eared Slider	Reptilia	XP_034628522	318	108	69%	82%
Xenopus tropicalis	Western Clawed Frog	Amphibia	NP_001016254	351.8	101	72%	86%
Rhinatrema bivittatum	Two-Lined Caecilian	Amphibia	XP_029432756	351.8	99	65%	78%
Danio rerio	Zebrafish	Actinopterygii	NP_001020706	435	104	70%	88%
Betta splendens	Siamese Fighting Fish	Actinopterygii	XP_029020899	435	114	64%	82%
Sphaeramia orbicularis	Orbiculate Cardnalfish	Actinopterygii	XP_030001408	435	117	60%	79%
Callorhinchus milii	Australian Ghostshark	Chondrichthyes	XP_007905737	473	98	62%	76%
Amblyraja radiata	Thorny Skate	Chondrichthyes	XP_032876338	473	108	56%	74%
Petromyzon marinus	Sea Lamprey	Hyperoartia	XP_032806823	615	101	48%	64%
Strongylocentrotus purpuratus	Purple Sea Urchin	Echinoidea	XP_030841965	684	105	36%	58%
Anneissia japonica	Feather Star	Crinoidea	XP_033119401	684	100	32%	55%
Acanthaster planci	Crown-of-Thorns Starfish	Asteroidea	XP_022098243	684	107	32%	52%
Branchiostoma floridae	Florida Lancelet	Leptocardii	XP_035671756	684	118	34%	52%
Asterias rubens	Common Starfish	Asteroidea	XP_033633586	684	106	31%	50%
Saccoglossus kowalevskii	Acorn Worm; Hemichordate	Enteropneusta	XP_002733905	684	95	31%	50%

=== Evolutionary context ===
==== Unrooted Phylogenetic Tree ====
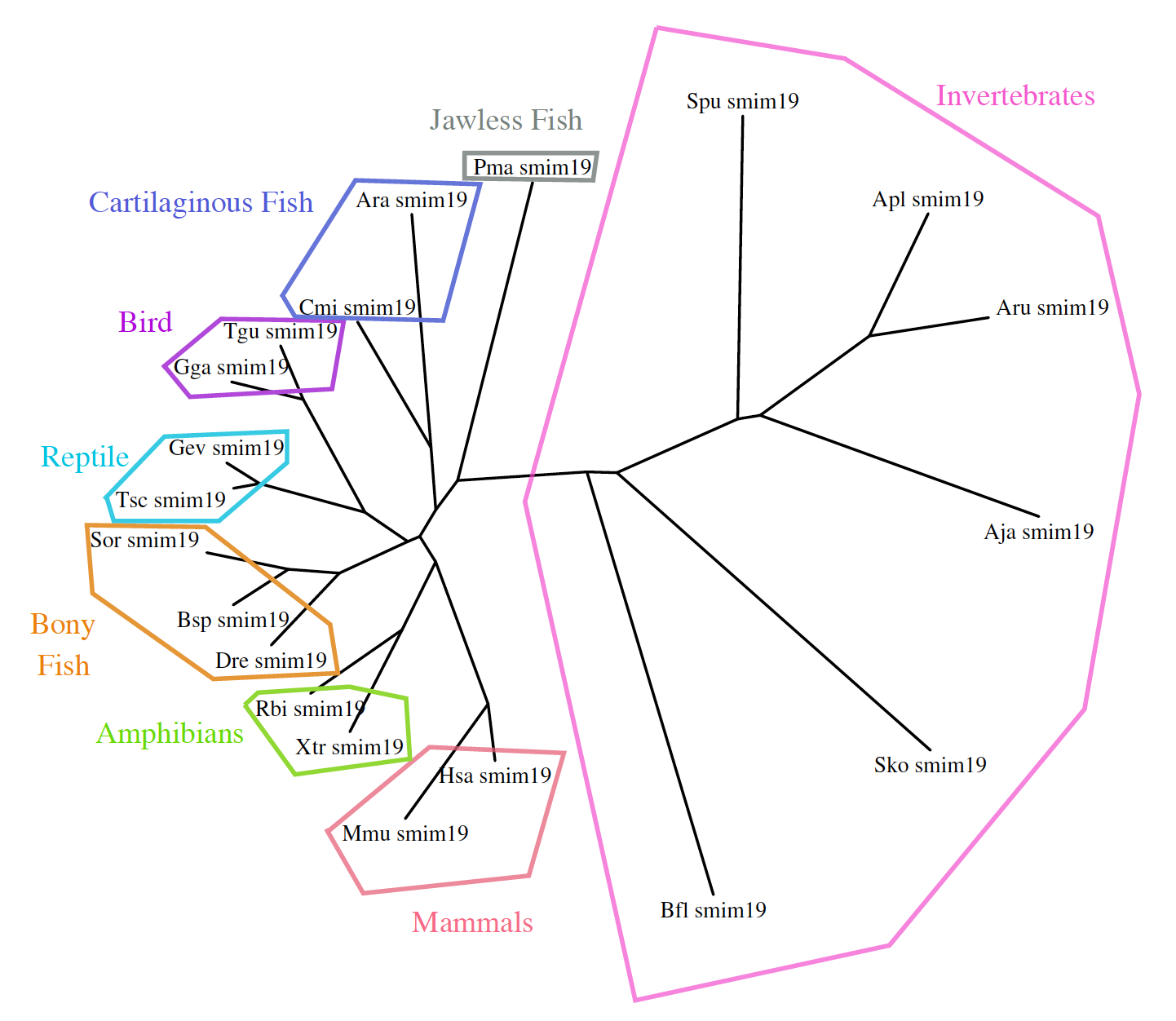
Phylogenetic tree from diverse set of selected homologs of SMIM19

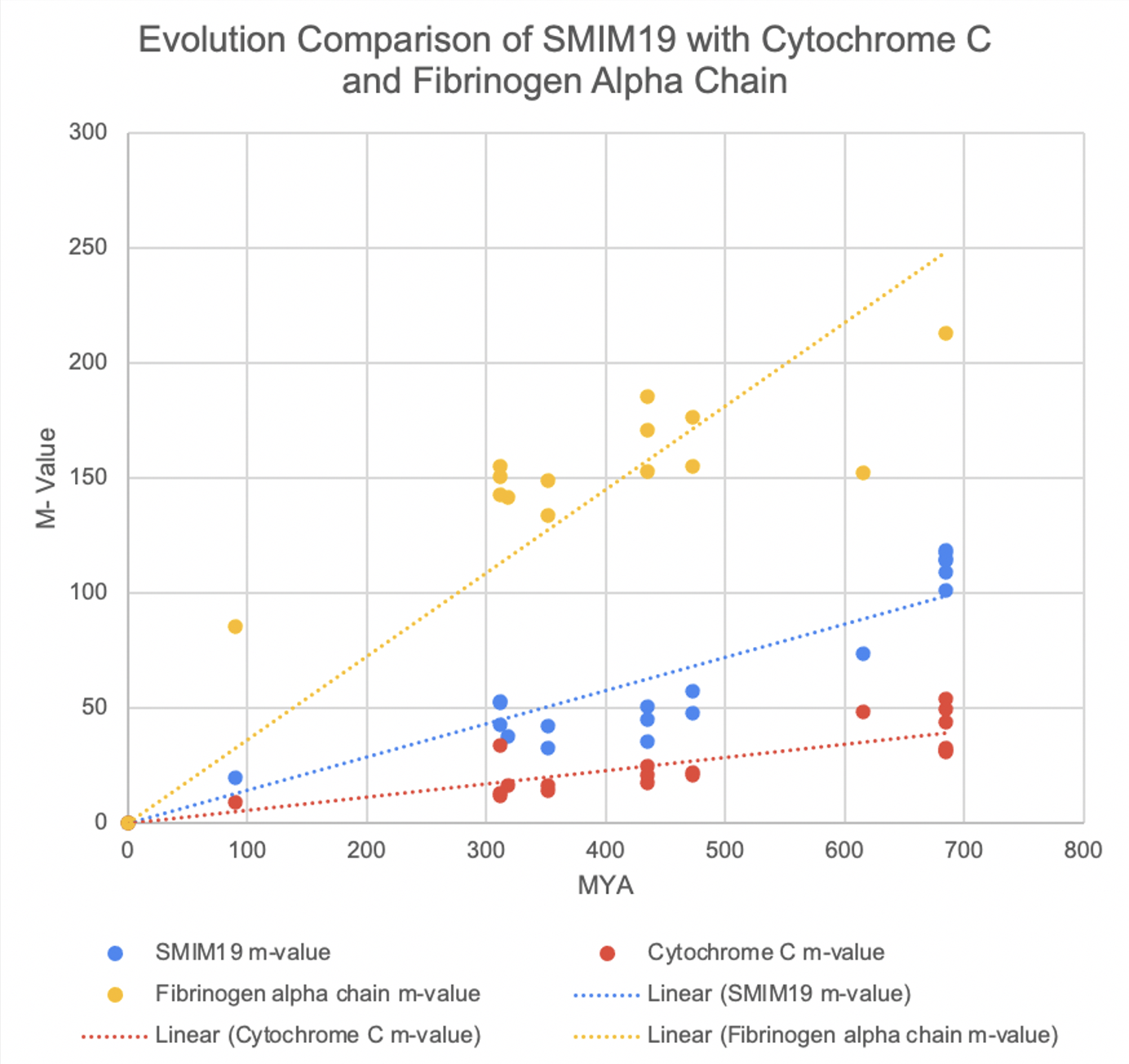
SMIM19 Gene Rate of Evolution

==== Rate of Evolution ====
SMIM19 has a comparatively fast evolution rate, estimated to be about 7 amino acid changes per 100 residues per one million years.

=== Interacting Proteins ===
SMIM19 Interacting Proteins
Linked Protein	Protein Name	Possible Function
O43681	ATPase GET3	ATPase required for post-translational delivery of tail-anchored (TA) proteins to the ER.
Q12797-6	Aspartyl/ asparaginyl beta-hydroxylase	Based on isoform, either hydroxylates Asp or Asn in EGF domains in some proteins or is a Calcium-sensing protein in the ER plasma membrane junctions.
Q8N5M9	Protein jagunal homolog 1	Endoplasmic reticulum transmembrane protein involved in vesicle transport, but unclear to which part of the process
Q9UHD9	Ubiquilin-2	Involved in regulation of protein degradation pathways including ubiquitin-proteasome system (UPS), autophagy and the endoplasmic reticulum-associated protein degradation (ERAD).
Q9UMX0	Ubiquilin-1	Involved in regulation of protein degradation pathways including ubiquitin-proteasome system (UPS), autophagy and the endoplasmic reticulum-associated protein degradation (ERAD).

== Function and Clinical Significance ==
Although the function of SMIM19 is relatively unclear, there are many links of SMIM19 to a large deletion, up to 9 genes sequentially in chromosome 8, including a seemingly important neighboring gene, SLC20A2, and including SMIM19 to basal ganglia calcification. Genes in this cytogenetic region, including SMIM19 gene, are also prone to down regulation in common breast tumors and cell lines pertaining to breast cancer. There is also evidence of SMIM19 becoming hypomethylated in hepatocellular carcinoma cells that were enriched with cancer stem cells

=== Mutations ===
The SNP results below are based on the output of accession NM_001135674.1 analysis on dbSNP Short Genetic Variation and were selected based on their location in significant portions of the SMIM19 protein. All SNPs chosen are located within the coding sequence. No SNPs were found within the 5’ UTR or 3’ UTR significant portions such as microRNA, so the focus was on the coding sequence. SNPs 1-15 were found as variations of the most conserved amino acids among all orthologs. SNPs 16-2 are found in the transmembrane region of SMIM19.

SMIM19 SELECTED SNPs
#	SNP	mRNA Position	Type of Mutation	Change Code
1	rs754352830	813	Synonymous	H19H
2	rs376759514	833	Missense	T26I
3	rs1352601365	835	Missense	N27D
4	rs758536154	837	Missense	N27K
5	rs758536154	837	Synonymous	N27N
6	rs780265959	843	Synonymous	Y29Y
7	rs745588341	881	Missense	Y42C
8	rs1254153666	906	Missense	I50M
9	rs369873306	912	Missense	R52S
10	rs1373469583	927	Synonymous	P57P
11	rs766437116	979	Frameshift	R76S
12	rs1295665189	986	Nonsense	L77--
13	rs920920699	990	Synonymous	R78R
14	rs140337330	996	Synonymous	Q80Q
15	rs1301639242	1018	Missense	R88G
16	rs751641872	853	Missense	I33F
17	rs1232858855	854	Frameshift	I33T
18	rs1168830076	855	Synonymous	I33I
19	rs749199760	877	Missense	M41L
20	rs749199760	877	Missense	M41V
21	rs778565419	879	Missense	M41I
