= SLC20A2 =

Protein-coding gene in the species Homo sapiens

Identifiers
- Aliases: SLC20A2, GLVR-2, GLVR2, IBGC1, IBGC3, MLVAR, PIT-2, PIT2, RAM1, Ram-1, solute carrier family 20 member 2, IBGC2
- External IDs: OMIM: 158378; MGI: 97851; GeneCards: SLC20A2

Gene location (Human)
Chr.	Chromosome 8 (human)
Band	8p11.21	Start	42,416,475 bp
Band	8p11.21	End	42,541,926 bp

Gene location (Mouse)
Chr.	Chromosome 8 (mouse)
Band	8 A2|8 11.42 cM	Start	22,966,804 bp
Band	8 A2|8 11.42 cM	End	23,059,628 bp
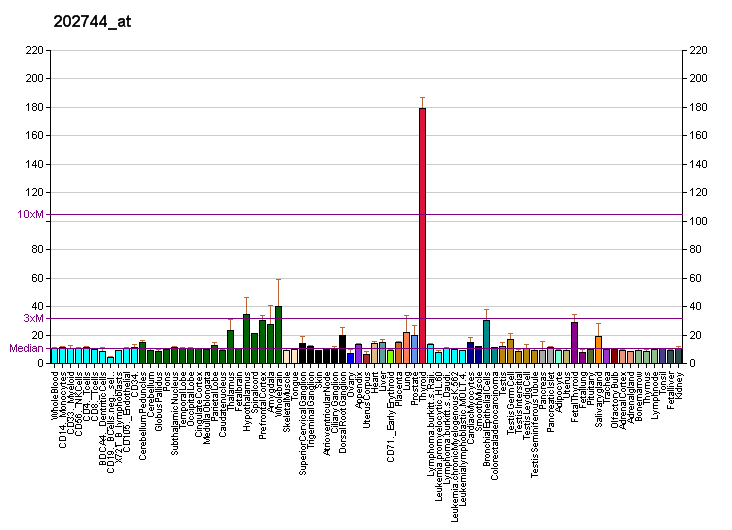
RNA expression pattern
Bgee	Human / Mouse (ortholog); Top expressed in: left lobe of thyroid gland; right lobe of thyroid gland; popliteal artery; muscle of thigh; tibial arteries; right auricle of heart; vena cava; corpus callosum; olfactory zone of nasal mucosa; C1 segment / Top expressed in: molar; interventricular septum; extraocular muscle; masseter muscle; retinal pigment epithelium; lens; iris; myocardium of ventricle; muscle of thigh; digastric muscle; More reference expression data
BioGPS	More reference expression data
Gene ontology
Molecular function	sodium:phosphate symporter activity; symporter activity; virus receptor activity; inorganic phosphate transmembrane transporter activity; sodium:inorganic phosphate symporter activity; signaling receptor activity
Cellular component	integral component of membrane; plasma membrane; integral component of plasma membrane; extracellular exosome; membrane
Biological process	sodium ion transport; viral entry into host cell; phosphate ion transport; viral process; ion transport; sodium ion transmembrane transport; transmembrane transport; phosphate ion transmembrane transport; sodium-dependent phosphate transport; transport
Sources:Amigo / QuickGO
Orthologs
Databases	NCBI: entry; OMA: entry
Species	Human	Mouse
Entrez	6575	20516
Ensembl	ENSG00000168575	ENSMUSG00000037656
UniProt	Q08357	Q80UP8
RefSeq (mRNA)	NM_001257180; NM_001257181; NM_006749	NM_011394
RefSeq (protein)	NP_001244109; NP_001244110; NP_006740	NP_035524
Location (UCSC)	Chr 8: 42.42 – 42.54 Mb	Chr 8: 22.97 – 23.06 Mb
PubMed search
- Wikidata
View/Edit Human	View/Edit Mouse

Sodium-dependent phosphate transporter 2 is a protein that in humans is encoded by the SLC20A2 gene.

== Genomics ==
This gene is found on the short arm of chromosome 8 (8p12-p11) on the minus (Crick) strand. It is 123,077 bases in length. The encoded protein has 652 amino acids and the predicted molecular weight of the protein is 70.392 kilodaltons.

== Function ==
The protein acts as a homodimer and is involved in phosphate transport by absorbing phosphate from interstitial fluid for normal cellular functions such as cellular metabolism, signal transduction, and nucleic acid and lipid synthesis.

== Clinical significance ==
Mutations in the SLC20A2 gene are associated with idiopathic basal ganglia calcification (Fahr's syndrome). This association suggests that familial idiopathic basal ganglia calcification is caused by changes in phosphate homeostasis, since this gene encodes for PIT-2, an inorganic phosphate transporter.

== See also ==
- Solute carrier family
