= Protein phosphatase 1 =

Class of enzymes

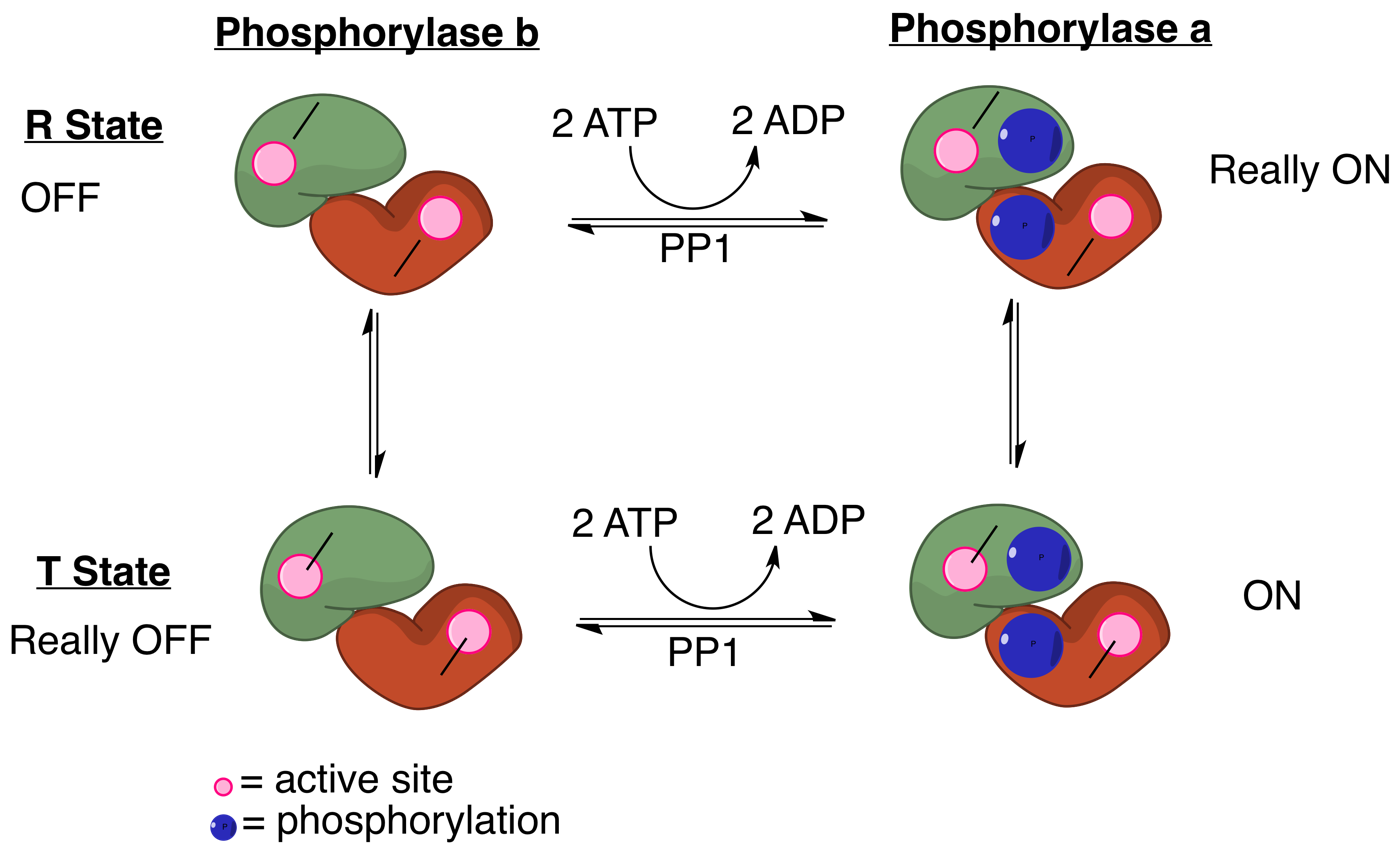
PP1 plays an instrumental role in glycogen metabolism through its responsibility for the interconversion between phosphorylase a and b.

Protein phosphatase 1 (PP1) belongs to the family of phosphoprotein phosphatases (PPPs) and removes phosphate groups from phospho-serine and phospho-threonine. PP1 has been found to be important in the control of glycogen metabolism, muscle contraction, cell progression, neuronal activities, splicing of RNA, mitosis, cell division, apoptosis, protein synthesis, and regulation of membrane receptors and channels.

== Structure ==
Each PP1 enzyme contains both a catalytic subunit and at least one regulatory subunit. The catalytic subunit consists of a 30-kD single-domain protein that can form complexes with other regulatory subunits. The catalytic subunit is highly conserved among all eukaryotes, thus suggesting a common catalytic mechanism. The catalytic subunit can form complexes with various regulatory subunits. These regulatory subunits play an important role in substrate specificity as well as compartmentalization. Some common regulatory subunits include GM (PPP1R3A) and GL (PPP1R3B), which are named after their locations of action within the body (muscle and liver respectively), While the yeast S. cerevisiae only encodes one catalytic subunit, mammals have four isozymes encoded by three genes, each attracting a different set of regulatory subunits. Regulation of these different processes is performed by distinct PP1 holoenzymes that facilitate the complexation of the PP1 catalytic subunit to various regulatory subunits. and PPP1R3G.

X-ray crystallographic structural data is available for PP1 catalytic subunit. The catalytic subunit of PP1 forms an α/β fold with a central β-sandwich arranged between two α-helical domains. The interaction of the three β-sheets of the β-sandwich creates a channel for catalytic activity, as it is the site of coordination of metal ions. These metal ions have been identified as Mn and Fe and their coordination is provided by three histidines, two aspartic acids, and one asparagine.

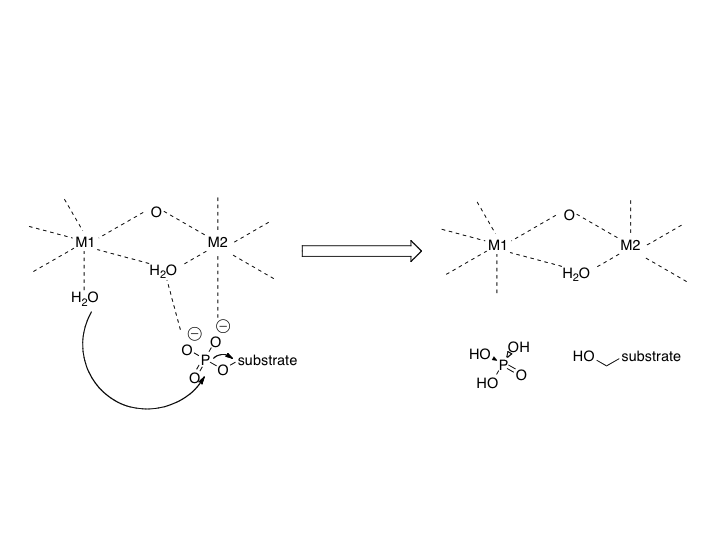
The PP1 mechanism involves the use of a di-metal ion and activating water.

=== Catalytic mechanism ===
The mechanism involves two metal ions binding and activating water, which initiates a nucleophilic attack on the phosphorus atom.

=== Exogeneous inhibitors ===
Potential inhibitors include a variety of naturally occurring toxins including okadaic acid, a diarrhetic shellfish poison, strong tumor promoter, and microcystin. Microcystin is a liver toxin produced by blue-green algae and contains a cyclic heptapeptide structure that interacts with three distinct regions of the surface of the catalytic subunit of PP1. The structure of MCLR does not change when complexed with PP1, but the catalytic subunit of PP1 does in order to avoid steric effects of Tyr 276 of PP1 and Mdha side chain of MCLR.

Cantharidic acid is also an inhibitor of PP1.

== Biological function and regulation ==
PP1 plays a crucial role in the regulation of blood glucose levels in the liver and glycogen metabolism. PP1 is important to the reciprocal regulation of glycogen metabolism by ensuring the opposite regulation of glycogen breakdown and glycogen synthesis. A key regulator of PP1 is glycogen phosphorylase a, which serves as a glucose sensor in hepatocytes. When glucose levels are low, phosphorylase a in its active R state has PP1 bound tightly. This binding to phosphorylase a prevents any phosphatase activity of PP1 and maintains the glycogen phosphorylase in its active phosphorylated configuration. Therefore, there phosphorylase a will accelerate glycogen breakdown until adequate levels of glucose are achieved. When glucose concentrations get too high, phosphorylase a is converted to its inactive, T state. By shifting phosphorylase a to its T state, PP1 dissociates from the complex. This dissociation activates glycogen synthase and converts phosphorylase a to phosphorylase b. Phosphorylase b does not bind PP1 allowing PP1 to remain activated.

When the muscles of the body signal the need for glycogen degradation and an increase in blood glucose, PP1 will be regulated accordingly. Protein kinase A (cAMP-dependent protein kinase) can reduce the activity of PP1. The glycogen binding region, GM, becomes phosphorylated, which causes its dissociation from the catalytic PP1 unit. This separation of the catalytic PP1 unit, glycogen, and other substrates causes a significant decrease in dephosphorylation. Also, when other substrates become phosphorylated by protein kinase A, they can bind to the catalytic subunit of PP1 and directly inhibit it. In the end, glycogen phosphorylase is kept in its active form and glycogen synthase in its inactive form. Separately from inhibition of PP1, glucagon will also keep phosphorylase kinase active via cAMP, thereby keeping glycogen phosphorylase active.

When blood sugar is high, insulin will be secreted by beta cells of the pancreas, indirectly activating glycogen synthase and triggering glycogen synthesis. Although it has been known that PP1 is one of the most important phosphatases involved in insulin action since the late 1990s, the precise mechanisms by which insulin regulates PP1 has only been uncovered more recently.

A 2019 study by researchers at Tsinghua, Fudan and the University of the Chinese Academy of Sciences demonstrated in both cell culture experiments and in PPP1R3G-knockdown mice that Akt (protein kinase B) directly phosphorylates Protein phosphatase 1 regulatory subunit 3G (PPP1R3G), which then binds to the PP1 complex, activating its phosphatase activity. The study demonstrated that phosphorylated PPP1R3G was also able to bind phosphorylated glycogen synthase (p-GS) independently and recruit p-GS towards PP1, allowing PP1 to dephosphorylate and thereby activate glycogen synthase independent of GSK3 (which is already known to be inhibited by Akt).

== Clinical relevance ==
In Alzheimer's, hyperphosphorylation of the microtubule-associated protein inhibits the assembly of microtubules in neurons. Researchers at the New York State Institute for Basic Research in Developmental Disabilities showed that there is significantly lower type 1 phosphatase activity in both gray and white matters in Alzheimer disease brains. This suggests that dysfunctional phosphatases play a role in Alzheimer's disease.

Regulation of HIV-1 transcription by Protein Phosphatase 1 (PP1). It has been recognized that protein phosphatase-1 (PP1) serves as an important regulator of HIV-1 transcription. Researchers at Howard University showed that Tat protein targets PP1 to the nucleus and the consequent interaction is important for HIV-1 transcription. The protein also contributes to ebolavirus pathogenesis by dephosphorylating the viral transcription activator VP30, allowing it to produce viral mRNAs. Inhibition of PP1 prevents VP30 dephosphorylation, thus preventing manufacture of viral mRNA, and thus viral protein. The viral L polymerase is, however, still capable of replicating viral genomes without VP30 dephosphorylation by PP1.

The herpes simplex virus protein ICP34.5 also activates protein phosphatase 1, which overcomes the cellular stress response to viral infection; protein kinase R is activated by the virus' double-stranded RNA, and protein kinase R then phosphorylates a protein called eukaryotic initiation factor-2A (eIF-2A), which inactivates eIF-2A. EIF-2A is required for translation so by shutting down eIF-2A, the cell prevents the virus from hijacking its own protein-making machinery. Herpesviruses in turn evolved ICP34.5 to defeat the defense; ICP34.5 activates protein phosphatase-1A which dephosphorylates eIF-2A, allowing translation to occur again. ICP34.5 shares the C-terminal regulatory domain (InterPro: IPR019523) with protein phosphatase 1 subunit 15A/B.

== Subunits ==
protein phosphatase 1, catalytic subunit, alpha isozyme

Identifiers
- Symbol: PPP1CA
- Alt. symbols: PP1, PP1a, MGC15877, MGC1674, PP-1A, PP1alpha, PPP1A
- NCBI gene: 5499
- HGNC: 9281
- OMIM: 176875
- RefSeq: NP_002699.1
- UniProt: P62136

Other data
- EC number: 3.1.3.16
- Locus: Chr. 11 q13
Search for
- Structures: Swiss-model
- Domains: InterPro

protein phosphatase 1, catalytic subunit, beta isozyme

Identifiers
- Symbol: PPP1CB
- Alt. symbols: PP1, PP1b, PP1beta, PP-1B; PPP1CD; MGC3672; PP1beta; PPP1CB
- NCBI gene: 5500
- HGNC: 9282
- OMIM: 600590
- RefSeq: NP_002700.1
- UniProt: P62140

Other data
- EC number: 3.1.3.16
- Locus: Chr. 2 p23
Search for
- Structures: Swiss-model
- Domains: InterPro

protein phosphatase 1, catalytic subunit, gamma isozyme

Identifiers
- Symbol: PPP1CC
- Alt. symbols: PP1gamma, PP1y, PP1gamma, PPP1G
- NCBI gene: 5501
- HGNC: 9283
- OMIM: 176914
- RefSeq: NP_002701.1
- UniProt: P36873

Other data
- EC number: 3.1.3.16
- Locus: Chr. 12 q24
Search for
- Structures: Swiss-model
- Domains: InterPro

Protein phosphatase 1 is a multimeric enzyme that may contain the following subunits:

- catalytic subunit: PPP1CA, PPP1CB, PPP1CC
- regulatory subunit 1: PPP1R1A, PPP1R1B, PPP1R1C
- regulatory subunit 2: PPP1R2
- regulatory subunit 3: PPP1R3A, PPP1R3B, PPP1R3C, PPP1R3D, PPP1R3E, PPP1R3F, PPP1R3G
- regulatory subunit 7: PPP1R7
- regulatory subunit 8: PPP1R8
- regulatory subunit 9: PPP1R9A, PPP1R9B
- regulatory subunit 10: PPP1R10
- regulatory subunit 11: PPP1R11
- regulatory subunit 12: PPP1R12A, PPP1R12B, PPP1R12C
- regulatory subunit 13: PPP1R13B
- regulatory subunit 14: PPP1R14A, PPP1R14B, PPP1R14C, PPP1R14D
- regulatory subunit 15: PPP1R15A, PPP1R15B
- regulatory subunit 16: PPP1R16A, PPP1R16B

As described earlier, a catalytic subunit is always paired with one or more regulatory subunits. The core sequence motif for binding to the catalytic subunit is "RVxF", but additional motifs allow for extra sites to be used. Some complexes with two regulatory subunits attached have been reported in 2002 and 2007.
