= Adipose-secreted signaling protein =

Protein-coding gene in the species Homo sapiens

ADISSP

Identifiers
- Aliases: ADISSP, C20orf27, Adipose-Secreted Signaling Protein, FLJ20550, Chromosome 20 Open Reading Frame 27, Hypothetical Protein LOC54976, UPF0687 Protein C20orf27
- External IDs: MGI: 1914576; GeneCards: ADISSP

Gene location (Human)
Chr.	Chromosome 20 (human)
Band	20p13	Start	3,753,508 bp
Band	20p13	End	3,767,781 bp

Gene location (Mouse)
Chr.	Chromosome 2 (mouse)
Band	2|2 F1	Start	130,988,244 bp
Band	2|2 F1	End	131,002,001 bp
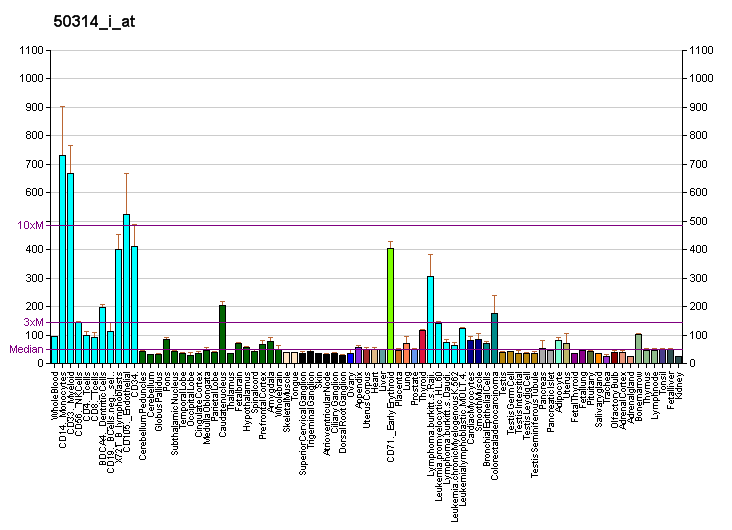

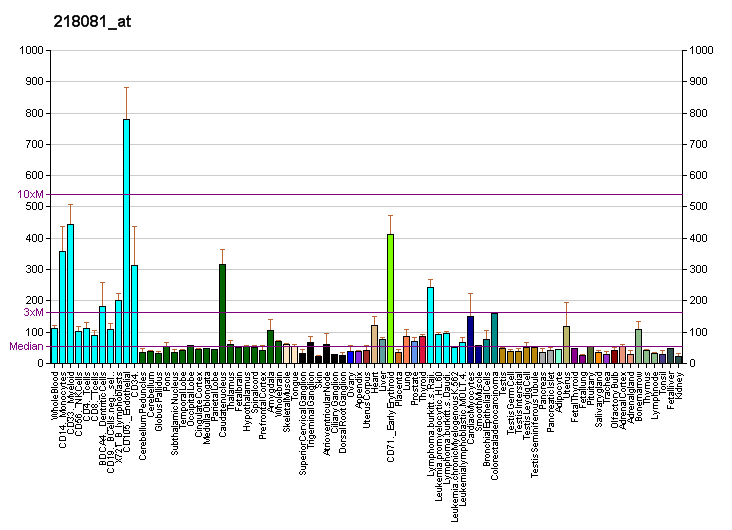
RNA expression pattern
Bgee	Human / Mouse (ortholog); Top expressed in: nucleus accumbens; caudate nucleus; putamen; muscle layer of sigmoid colon; granulocyte; right ovary; left uterine tube; left ovary; decidua; monocyte / Top expressed in: seminiferous tubule; supraoptic nucleus; brown adipose tissue; dorsomedial hypothalamic nucleus; somite; dorsal tegmental nucleus; olfactory tubercle; superior frontal gyrus; globus pallidus; nucleus accumbens; More reference expression data
BioGPS	More reference expression data
Gene ontology
Molecular function	molecular function; protein binding
Cellular component	cellular component
Biological process	biological process
Sources:Amigo / QuickGO
Orthologs
Databases	NCBI: entry; OMA: entry
Species	Human	Mouse
Entrez	54976	67326
Ensembl	ENSG00000101220	ENSMUSG00000027327
UniProt	Q9GZN8	Q9D1K7
RefSeq (mRNA)	NM_001039140; NM_001258429; NM_001258430; NM_017874	NM_026091; NM_001311138; NM_001361375
RefSeq (protein)	NP_001034229; NP_001245358; NP_001245359	NP_001298067; NP_080367; NP_001348304
Location (UCSC)	Chr 20: 3.75 – 3.77 Mb	Chr 2: 130.99 – 131 Mb
PubMed search
- Wikidata
View/Edit Human	View/Edit Mouse

Adipose-secreted signaling protein is a protein that in humans is encoded by the gene ADISSP (previously C20orf27). It is expressed in the majority of the human tissues. One study on this protein revealed its role in regulating cell cycle, apoptosis, and tumorigenesis via promoting the activation of NFĸB pathway.

== Gene ==
Adipose-secreted signaling protein has other aliases, UPF0687 Protein C20orf27, Chromosome 20 Open Reading Frame 27, Hypothetical Protein LOC54976, C20orf27, and FLJ20550. It is located on the minus strand at 20p13. It consists of 7 exons and 12 introns. This most updated annotation shows that gene ADISSP starts at 3,753,499 bp to 3,768,388 bp on Chromosome 20.

== Transcription ==
=== Known isoforms ===
The ADISSP gene has 5 transcript isoforms, ADISSP transcript variant 1, ADISSP transcript variant 2, ADISSP transcript variant 3, and ADISSP transcript variant 4.

Transcript variant 1 encodes for the longest protein isoform, with a size of 1327 bases and 6 exons.

Transcript variant 2 maintains the reading frames and 6 exons compared to transcript variant 1, but it has an alternative spliced site in the coding region. It has a size of 1252 bases.

Transcription variant 3 has a size of 1706 bases and 6 exons. This variant has an alternative spliced site in the coding region and differs in the 5' UTR, but it still maintains the reading frame seen in transcript variant 1. Despite their differences in size, variant 2 and variant 3 encodes the same protein isoform and this second protein isoform is shorted than the protein isoform encoded by transcript variant 1.

Transcript variant 4 has a size of 1457 bases with 6 exons. Compared to variant 1, it uses an alternative 5'-most exon and an alternative splice site. Because of the presence of an upstream ORF that is predicted to interfere with translation of this variant, the transcription variant 4 does not encode any protein.

The information on transcript variant X1 comes from GRCh38.p13 Primary Assembly. This variant has a size of 1195 bases, and the number of exons in this variant remains unknown.

== Proteins ==
=== Physical features ===
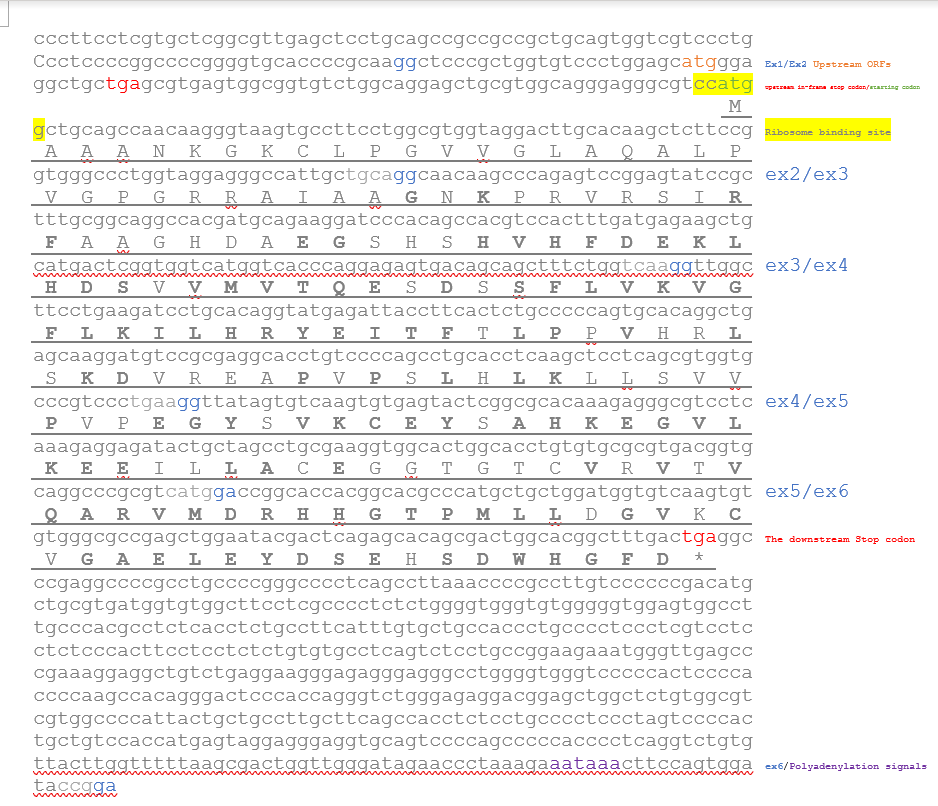
Conceptional translation of ADISSP. Labeled are start and stop codons, exon spliced regions, polyadrenylation signals, and ribosome binding site. Bold are conserved amino acids.

The human gene ADISSP has three known isoforms.

Isoform 1 has 199 amino acid residues and a domain named DUF4517. Isoform 2 has 174 amino acid residues, and isoform X1 has 154 amino acid residues. All three isoforms contain the same domain DUF4517. The function of domain DUF4517 requires future research.

The predicted isoelectric point of unmodified protein ADISSP is 6.89.

The percentage of each amino acid residue is about its average percentage among human proteins. Overall, the positively charged amino acid residues in human protein ADISSP outnumbers the negatively charged amino acid residues. Protein ADISSP has no high scoring hydrophobic regions, no highly charged regions, and no transmembrane regions.

=== Post-translation modifications ===
The predicted molecular weight of ADISSP is 21.6 kDa. A Western Blot binding pattern on protein ADISSP with its polyclonal antibody reveals that the experimental molecular weight of protein ADISSP is about 22 kDa. This suggests that there are relatively few post-translation modifications on protein ADISSP.

There is no predicted signal peptide or cleavage site.

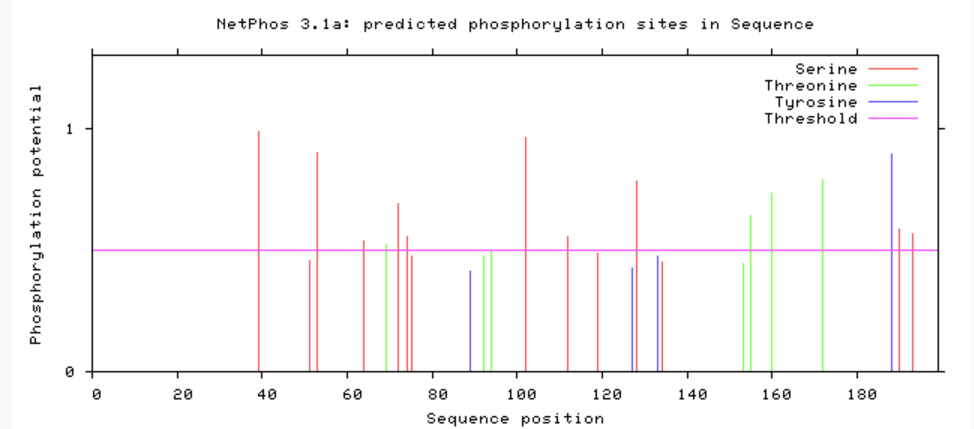
Predicted phosphorylation sites in protein ADISSP by NetPhos 3.1

There are many predicted phosphorylation sites along the sequence of protein ADISSP, including four sites for protein kinase A (PKA), two sites for protein kinase C (PKC), three sites for casein kinase 2 (CKII), one site for ribosomal S6 kinase (RSK), one site for cGMP-dependent protein kinase or Protein Kinase G (PKG), and one site for ataxia-telangiectasia mutated (ATM) serine/threonine protein kinase.

Protein ADISSP is predicted to have other post-translation modification sites including five palmitoylation sites, one c-mannosylation site, and two sumoylation sites.

=== Structure ===
Three stretches of beta sheet from amino acid 62 to 67, 76 to 87, and 92 to 100 are predicted with the highest confidence using CFSSP and Phyre2. A model predicted by I-TASSER shows that the tertiary structure of human protein ADISSP is a combination of many beta sheets. This confirms the predictions made by CFSSP and Phyre2.

=== Subcellular Localization ===
This protein is expected to be found in cytosol and nucleus, but not in nuclei. Additional computational analysis predicts that this protein is most likely to be in cytosol.

== Expression ==
Protein ADISSP is expressed ubiquitously throughout different human tissues. Microarray-assessed tissue expression pattern suggests caudate nucleus has the highest expression of protein ADISSP.

Other than caudate nucleus, protein ADISSP expression measure ranks at the top 25% among 100 proteins in pons, fetal brain, BM- CD105+ endothelial, BM- CD34+, bone marrow, adipocyte, uterus corpus, 721 BLymphoblast, PB- CD56+NK cells, BM- CD33+ myeloid, colorectal adenocarcinoma, leukemia chronic Myelogenous K-562, leukemia lymphoblastic (MOLT-4), and leukemia promyelocytic-HL-60.

In situ hybridization data has shown that the expression of ADISSP in airway epithelial cells (AECs) can be correlated to chronic lung diseases. After AECs are treated with IL-13, which is a cytokine expressed by CD4 T helper cells, AECs begin to secrete excess mucous, and excess mucous secretion in the airway is a mark of chronic lung diseases.

== Regulation of expression ==
=== Gene level expression ===
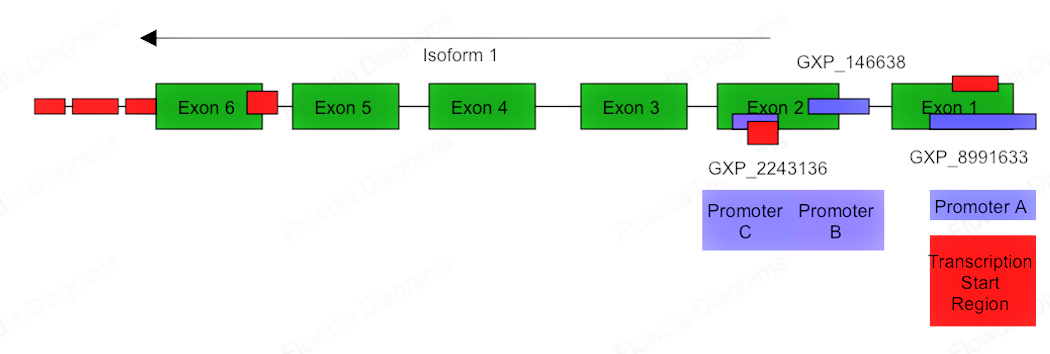
ADISSP Promoter Diagram

There are three promoter regions in gene ADISSP.

Five transcription factors that bind to the promoter region of gene ADISSP have been discovered, including MITF, JUN, ZNF282, FOXA1, and TCF7L2.

Using genomatix, more transcription factor binding sites are predicted. Transcription binding matrix, like EGR/nerve growth factor induced protein C & related factors, GC-Box factors SP1/GC, Krueppel like transcription factors, Myc associated zinc fingers, vertebrate homologues of enhancer of split complex, E-box binding factors, E2F-myc activator/cell cycle regulator, and BED subclass of zinc-finger proteins, are predicted to give the highest matrix similarity.

=== Transcript level regulation ===
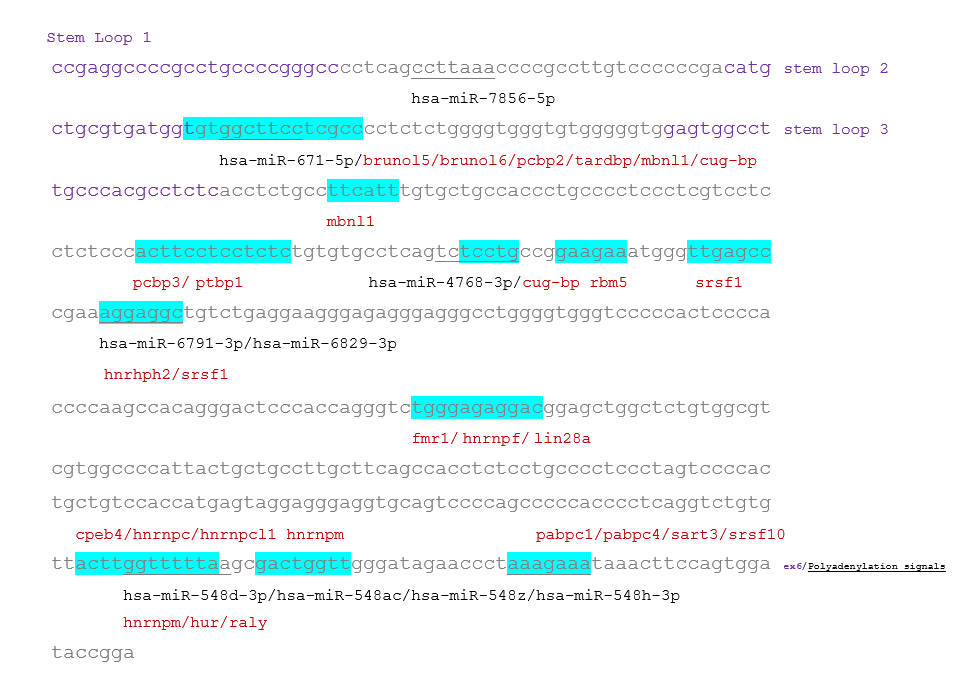
The 3' end of ADISSP mRNA including all the predicted microRNA binding sites, predicted mRNA binding protein binding sites, and the sequence of three predicted stem loops.

Predicted miRNA binding sites in 3' end of ADISSP mRNA which sequences are also conserved evolutionarily are hsa-miR-7856-5p, hsa-miR-671-5p, hsa-miR-4768, hsa-miR-6791-3p, hsa-miR-6829-3p, hsa-miR-548d-3p, hsa-miR-548-3p, hsa-miR-548z, and hsa-miR-548h-3p.

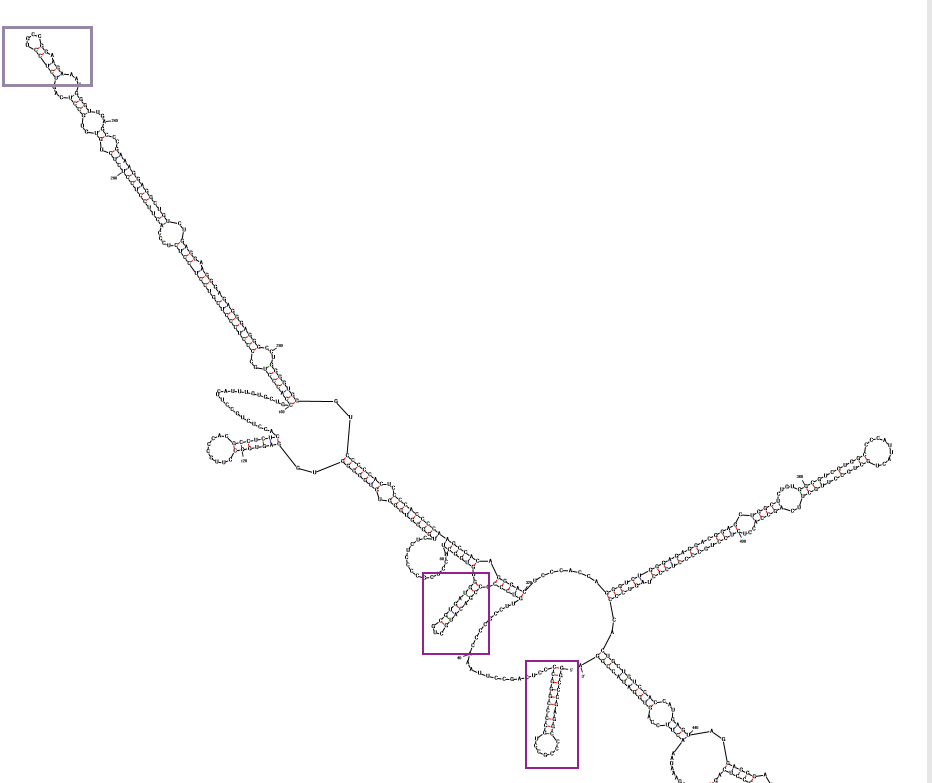
Predicted ADISSP mRNA secondary structure

The formation of three stem loops is conserved in different predicted models. The three stem loops start from the 5' end of ADISSP mRNA base 1 to base 27, base 56 to base 74, and base 116 to base 130.

The mRNA of ADISSP has about 23 predicted mRNA binding protein binding sites which sequences are also conserved in evolution. The names of these mRNA binding proteins are BRUNOL5, BRUNOL6, PCBP2, TARDBP, MBNL1, CUG-BP, PCBP3, PTBP1, RBM5, SRSF1, HNRNPH2, FMR1, HNRNPF, LIN28A, CPEB4, HNRNPC, HNRNPCL1, HNRNPM, HuR, RALY, PABPC1, PABPC4, SART3, and SRSF10.

== Function and clinical significance ==
=== Interacting proteins ===
Interactors of protein ADISSP found in Y2H screen are replicase polyprotein 1ab from coronavirus, RAIYL, PHKB, FERMT2 from human. The function of replicase polyprotein 1ab is transcribing and replicating viral RNAs, and it contains the proteinases responsible for the cleavages of the polyprotein. The function of RAIYL, PHKB, and FERMT2 remain unknown.

Other interactors that discovered by pull-down assays include PPP1CA, PPP1CB, PPP1CC, PPP1R7, PSME3, RBFOX2, and DMWD. Interactors PPP1CA, PPP1CB, PPP1CC, and PPP1R7 have similar functions. They involve in the regulation of a variety of cellular processes, such as cell division, glycogen metabolism, muscle contractility, protein synthesis, and HIV-1 viral transcription. PSME3 facilitates the MDM2-p53/TP53 interaction which promotes ubiquitination- and MDM2-dependent proteasomal degradation of p53/TP53, limiting its accumulation and resulting in inhibited apoptosis after DNA damage, and might play a role in cell cycle regulation. RBFOX2 regulates alternative splicing events by binding to 5'-UGCAUGU-3' elements. The function of DMWD is unknown.

The above evidence suggests protein ADISSP plays a role in cell cycle regulation, cell proliferation and differentiation, and cell survival.

=== Clinical significance ===
Human protein ADISSP and its variants have not been discovered to be associated with any diseases or disorders.

== Homology and evolution history ==
=== Paralogs ===
There are no known paralogs.

=== Orthologs ===
There are about 281+ known orthologs for this gene, ranging from primates to invertebrates.

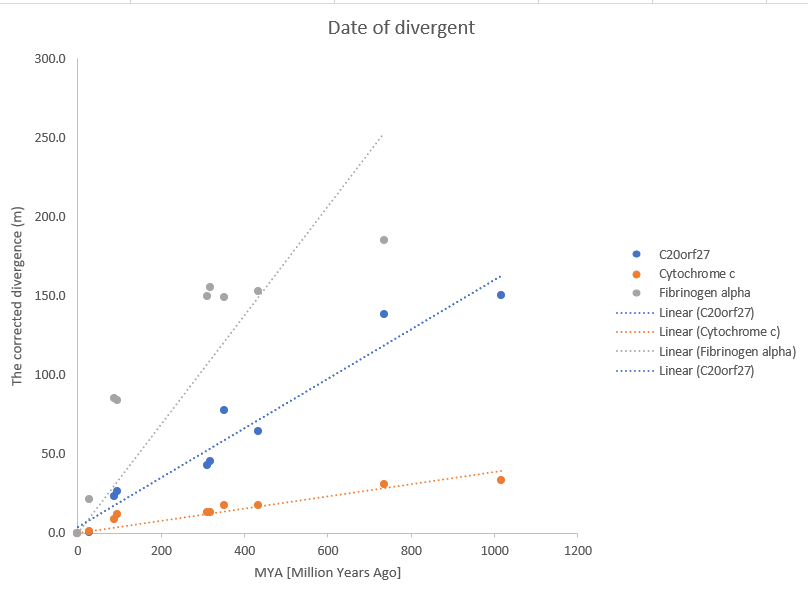
Graph showing gene ADISSP rate of divergence compared to cytochrome c and fibrinogen alpha.

The closest related orthologs are selected from primates and mammals, and the sequence similarity ranks from 75% to 100%. The moderately related orthologs are selected from fishes and birds, and the sequence similarity ranks from 55% to 75%. The most distantly related orthologs are selected from invertebrates and trichoplax, and the sequence similarity ranks from 40% to 55%. The conserved amino acids are bold in the conceptional translation diagram.

Gene name	Genus and Species	Taxonomic group	Common Names	Accession Num.	Protein Length	Seq Identity	Seq Similarity	MYA
ADISSP	Homo sapiens	Primates	Human	NP_001034229.1	199 aa	100%	100%	0
Adissp	Macaca mulatta	Primates	Old World Monkey	AFE71948.1	197 aa	98.50%	99%	29.44
Adissp	Mus musculus	Rodentia	House mouse	NP_001298067.1	177 aa	79.40%	82.90%	90
Adissp	Rhinolophus ferrumequinum	Chiroptera	Greater horseshoe bat	XP_032951391.1	174 aa	82.40%	85.40%	96
Adissp	Condylura cristata	Eulipotyphla	Star-nosed mole	XP_012583921.1	184 aa	76.60%	79.90%	96
Adissp	Dromaius novaehollandiae	Casuariiformes	Emu	XP_025975497.1	174 aa	65.30%	72.90%	312
Adissp	Gopherus evgoodei	Testudines	Gopher Tortoises	XP_030419106.1	176 aa	61.80%	73.90%	312
Adissp	Strigops habroptila	Psittaciformes	Kākāpō	XP_030348224.1	174 aa	59.30%	70.40%	312
Adissp	Thamnophis elegans	Scaled reptiles	Western terrestrial garter snake	XP_032094251.1	174 aa	56.80%	68.30%	312
Adissp	Taeniopygia guttata	Passeriformes	Zebra finch	NP_001232719.1	176 aa	56.70%	67.50%	312
Adissp	Xenopus tropicalis	Frogs	Western clawed frog	NP_001007504.1	174 aa	59.30%	72.40%	351.8
Adissp	Scophthalmus maximus	Pleuronectiformes	Turbot	AWP06390.1	179 aa	29.70%	43.20%	435
Adissp	Callorhinchus milii	Chimaera	Australian ghostshark	XP_007906148.1	179 aa	54.00%	63.90%	473
Adissp	Petromyzon marinus	Petromyzontiformes	Sea lamprey	XP_032806447.1	173 aa	47.60%	55.80%	615
Adissp	Anneissia japonica	Comatulida	comasterids	XP_033124803.1	184 aa	26.60%	46.30%	684
Adissp	Ixodes scapularis	Ixodida	Deer tick	XP_002403181.1	165 aa	28.80%	44.20%	797
Adissp	Limulus polyphemus	Xiphosura	Atlantic horseshoe crab	XP_022257482.1	173 aa	28.80%	44.50%	797
Adissp	Crassostrea gigas	Ostreida	Pacific oyster	XP_011438297.1	162 aa	24.90%	44.00%	797
Adissp	Drosophila subobscura	Fly	Fruit Fly	XP_034657203.1	179 aa	24.70%	37.70%	797
Adissp	Nematostella vectensis	Sea anemone	Starlet sea anemone	XP_001627979.1	169 aa	30.30%	43.30%	824
Adissp	Trichoplax	Trichoplax	Trichoplax	RDD38604.1	166 aa	22.3%	40.0%	1017
