= DMWD =

DMWD may refer to:

- Department of Miscellaneous Weapons Development, a British Admiralty department during World War II
- DMWD (gene), a human gene protein which encodes dystrophia myotonica WD repeat-containing protein
