= PTG =

PTG or ptg may refer to:

- .ptg, the file type used by ArtRage
- Pan African Tobacco Group
- Pentagon (South Korean band)
- Piano Technicians Guild
- Police Tactical Group
- PPP1R3C, a protein phosphatase 1 targeting subunit
- Post-traumatic growth
