= PPP1R3C =

Protein-coding gene in the species Homo sapiens

Identifiers
- Aliases: PPP1R3C, PPP1R5, protein phosphatase 1 regulatory subunit 3C, PTG
- External IDs: OMIM: 602999; MGI: 1858229; GeneCards: PPP1R3C

Gene location (Human)
Chr.	Chromosome 10 (human)
Band	10q23.32	Start	91,628,442 bp
Band	10q23.32	End	91,633,071 bp

Gene location (Mouse)
Chr.	Chromosome 19 (mouse)
Band	19|19 C2	Start	36,709,131 bp
Band	19|19 C2	End	36,714,053 bp
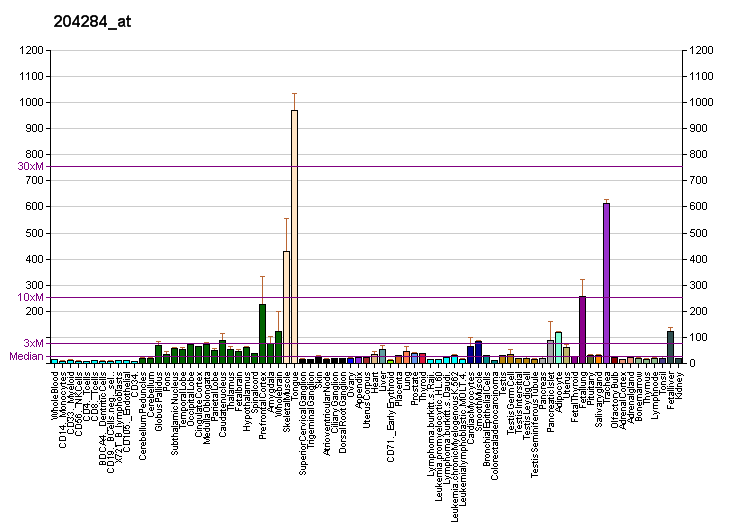
RNA expression pattern
Bgee	Human / Mouse (ortholog); Top expressed in: Skeletal muscle tissue of rectus abdominis; Skeletal muscle tissue of biceps brachii; vastus lateralis muscle; triceps brachii muscle; body of tongue; glutes; deltoid muscle; tibialis anterior muscle; vena cava; saphenous vein / Top expressed in: sternocleidomastoid muscle; triceps brachii muscle; muscle of thigh; digastric muscle; intercostal muscle; temporal muscle; vastus lateralis muscle; left lung lobe; medial head of gastrocnemius muscle; atrioventricular valve; More reference expression data
BioGPS	More reference expression data
Gene ontology
Molecular function	protein serine/threonine phosphatase activity; protein phosphatase regulator activity; protein binding; protein phosphatase binding
Cellular component	cytosol
Biological process	protein dephosphorylation; glycogen biosynthetic process; glycogen metabolic process; carbohydrate metabolic process; regulation of phosphoprotein phosphatase activity
Sources:Amigo / QuickGO
Orthologs
Databases	NCBI: entry; OMA: entry
Species	Human	Mouse
Entrez	5507	53412
Ensembl	ENSG00000119938	ENSMUSG00000067279
UniProt	Q9UQK1	Q7TMB3
RefSeq (mRNA)	NM_005398	NM_016854
RefSeq (protein)	NP_005389	NP_058550
Location (UCSC)	Chr 10: 91.63 – 91.63 Mb	Chr 19: 36.71 – 36.71 Mb
PubMed search
- Wikidata
View/Edit Human	View/Edit Mouse

Protein phosphatase 1 regulatory subunit 3C also known as PTG is an enzyme that in humans is encoded by the PPP1R3C gene.

== Function ==
Protein phosphatase-1 (PP1) participates in the regulation of a wide variety of cellular functions by reversible protein phosphorylation. The ability of PP1 to regulate diverse functions resides in its capacity to interact with a variety of regulatory subunits that may target PP1 to specific subcellular locations, modulate its substrate specificity, and allow its activity to be responsive to extracellular signals. Several targeting subunits of PP1 have been identified, including PPP1R5, the glycogen-binding subunits G_{M}, G_{L}, PTG and R6 and PPP1R4, and the nuclear inhibitor of PP1 (PPP1R8).
