= PPP1R14A =

Protein found in humans

Identifiers
- Aliases: PPP1R14A, CPI-17, CPI17, PPP1INL, protein phosphatase 1 regulatory inhibitor subunit 14A
- External IDs: OMIM: 608153; MGI: 1931139; GeneCards: PPP1R14A

Gene location (Mouse)
Chr.	Chromosome 7 (mouse)
Band	7|7 B1	Start	28,988,733 bp
Band	7|7 B1	End	28,993,226 bp
RNA expression pattern
Bgee	Human / Mouse (ortholog); Top expressed in: right coronary artery; ascending aorta; popliteal artery; left coronary artery; saphenous vein; inferior ganglion of vagus nerve; gastric mucosa; right lung; substantia nigra; left uterine tube / Top expressed in: tunica media of zone of aorta; ascending aorta; umbilical cord; lumbar subsegment of spinal cord; right lung; left lung lobe; aortic valve; right lung lobe; anterior horn of spinal cord; deep cerebellar nuclei; More reference expression data
BioGPS	n/a
Gene ontology
Molecular function	protein phosphatase inhibitor activity; protein serine/threonine phosphatase inhibitor activity
Cellular component	cytoplasm; cytosol
Biological process	regulation of phosphorylation; negative regulation of phosphoprotein phosphatase activity
Sources:Amigo / QuickGO
Orthologs
Databases	NCBI: entry
Species	Human	Mouse
Entrez	94274	68458
Ensembl	n/a	ENSMUSG00000037166
UniProt	Q96A00	Q91VC7
RefSeq (mRNA)	NM_033256; NM_001243947	NM_026731
RefSeq (protein)	NP_001230876; NP_150281	NP_081007
Location (UCSC)	n/a	Chr 7: 28.99 – 28.99 Mb
PubMed search
- Wikidata
View/Edit Human	View/Edit Mouse

Protein phosphatase 1 regulatory subunit 14A also known as CPI-17 (C-kinase potentiated Protein phosphatase-1 Inhibitor Mr = 17 kDa) is a protein that in humans is encoded by the PPP1R14A gene.

== Function ==
CPI-17 is a phosphorylation-dependent inhibitor protein of smooth muscle myosin phosphatase, discovered in pig aortic homogenates. Phosphorylation of the Thr-38 residue converts the protein into a potent inhibitor for myosin phosphatase. A single phosphorylation of CPI-17 at Thr-38 triggers a global conformational change that causes re-alignment of four helices. Multiple kinases are identified to phosphorylate CPI-17, such as PKC, ROCK, PKN, ZIPK, ILK, and PAK. Agonist stimulation of smooth muscle enhances CPI-17 phosphorylation mainly through PKC and ROCK. Myosin phosphatase inhibition increases myosin phosphorylation and smooth muscle contraction in the absence of increased intracellular Ca^{2+} concentration. This phenomenon is known as Ca^{2+} sensitization, which occurs in response to agonist stimulation of smooth muscle. In Purkinje neuron, CPI-17 is involved in long-term synaptic depression.

There are three homologues of CPI-17:

- Phosphatase Holoenzyme Inhibitor (PHI: PPP1R14B),
- Kinase Enhanced Phosphatase Inhibitor (KEPI: PPP1R14C), and
- Gastric-Brain Phosphatase Inhibitor (GBPI: PPP1R14D).

== Clinical significance ==
CPI-17 is up-regulated some cancer cells, and causes hyperphosphorylation of tumor suppressor merlin/NF2. In prostate cancer, CPI-17 expressions are reported to be associated with GWAS risk SNP rs7247241 T allele and increase cell proliferation.
