= (phosphorylase) phosphatase =

Class of enzymes

phosphorylase a phosphatase

Identifiers
- EC no.: 3.1.3.17
- CAS no.: 9025-74-5

Databases
- IntEnz: IntEnz view
- BRENDA: BRENDA entry
- ExPASy: NiceZyme view
- KEGG: KEGG entry
- MetaCyc: metabolic pathway
- PRIAM: profile
- PDB structures: RCSB PDB PDBe PDBsum
- Gene Ontology: AmiGO / QuickGO
Search
- PMC: articles
- PubMed: articles
- NCBI: proteins

The enzyme phosphorylase a phosphatase (EC 3.1.3.17) catalyzes the reaction

[phosphorylase a] + 4 H_{2}O $\rightleftharpoons$ 2 [phosphorylase b] + 4 phosphate

It is synonymous with Protein phosphatase 1. This enzyme belongs to the family of hydrolases, specifically those acting on phosphoric monoester bonds. The systematic name is [phosphorylase a] phosphohydrolase. Other names in common use include PR-enzyme, phosphorylase a phosphatase, glycogen phosphorylase phosphatase, protein phosphatase C, and type 1 protein phosphatase.
