= PHACTR3 =

Protein-coding gene in the species Homo sapiens

Identifiers
- Aliases: PHACTR3, C20orf101, H17739, PPP1R123, SCAPIN1, SCAPININ, phosphatase and actin regulator 3
- External IDs: OMIM: 608725; MGI: 1921439; GeneCards: PHACTR3

Gene location (Human)
Chr.	Chromosome 20 (human)
Band	20q13.32-q13.33	Start	59,577,509 bp
Band	20q13.32-q13.33	End	59,847,711 bp

Gene location (Mouse)
Chr.	Chromosome 2 (mouse)
Band	2|2 H4	Start	177,760,768 bp
Band	2|2 H4	End	177,980,285 bp
RNA expression pattern
Bgee	Human / Mouse (ortholog); Top expressed in: amygdala; internal globus pallidus; C1 segment; substantia nigra; corpus callosum; cingulate gyrus; anterior cingulate cortex; right frontal lobe; Brodmann area 9; hippocampus proper / Top expressed in: piriform cortex; olfactory tubercle; superior frontal gyrus; cingulate gyrus; globus pallidus; superior cervical ganglion; temporal lobe; visual cortex; primary motor cortex; hippocampus proper; More reference expression data
BioGPS	n/a
Gene ontology
Molecular function	protein phosphatase inhibitor activity; protein phosphatase 1 binding; actin binding; protein phosphatase regulator activity
Cellular component	nuclear matrix; nucleus; nucleoplasm
Biological process	negative regulation of phosphoprotein phosphatase activity; regulation of phosphoprotein phosphatase activity
Sources:Amigo / QuickGO
Orthologs
Databases	NCBI: entry; OMA: entry
Species	Human	Mouse
Entrez	116154	74189
Ensembl	ENSG00000087495	ENSMUSG00000027525
UniProt	Q96KR7	Q8BYK5
RefSeq (mRNA)	NM_001199505; NM_001199506; NM_001281507; NM_080672; NM_183244 NM_183246	NM_001007154; NM_001177789; NM_001177790; NM_001177791; NM_028806
RefSeq (protein)	NP_001186434; NP_001186435; NP_001268436; NP_542403; NP_899067 NP_899069	NP_001007155; NP_001171260; NP_001171261; NP_001171262; NP_083082
Location (UCSC)	Chr 20: 59.58 – 59.85 Mb	Chr 2: 177.76 – 177.98 Mb
PubMed search
- Wikidata
View/Edit Human	View/Edit Mouse

Phosphatase and actin regulator 3 is an enzyme that in humans is encoded by the PHACTR3 gene.

== Function ==
The protein encoded by this gene is associated with the nuclear scaffold in proliferating cells. It was found to bind to the catalytic subunit of protein phosphatase-1 (PP1) and inhibit PP1 activity, suggesting that this protein may function as a regulatory subunit of PP1. Alternative splicing at this locus results in several transcript variants encoding different isoforms.

== Interactions ==
PHACTR3 has been shown to interact with PPP1CA.
