= PPP1R11 =

Protein-coding gene in the species Homo sapiens

Identifiers
- Aliases: PPP1R11, HCG-V, HCGV, IPP3, TCTE5, TCTEX5, CFAP255, protein phosphatase 1 regulatory inhibitor subunit 11
- External IDs: OMIM: 606670; MGI: 1923747; GeneCards: PPP1R11
Enzyme activity
EC #	BRENDA	ExPASy	KEGG	MetaCyc
2.3.2.27	↗	↗	↗	↗

Gene location (Human)
Chr.	Chromosome 6 (human)
Band	6p22.1	Start	30,066,709 bp
Band	6p22.1	End	30,070,333 bp

Gene location (Mouse)
Chr.	Chromosome 17 (mouse)
Band	17 B1|17 19.16 cM	Start	37,259,248 bp
Band	17 B1|17 19.16 cM	End	37,262,633 bp
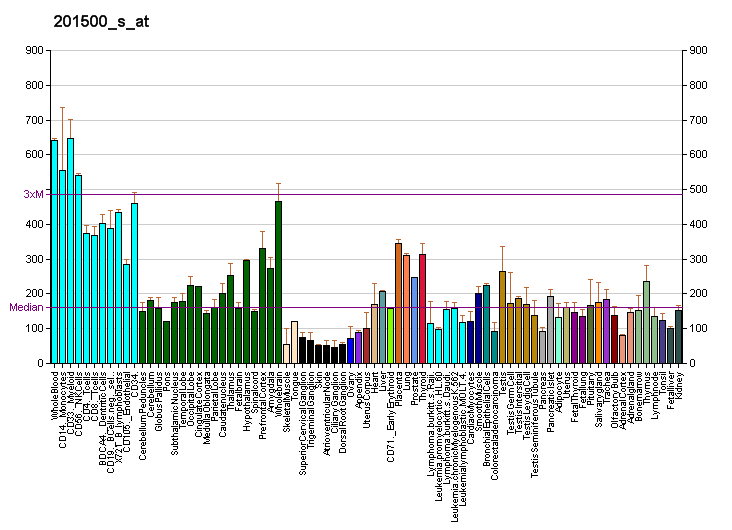
RNA expression pattern
Bgee	Human / Mouse (ortholog); Top expressed in: rectum; superior frontal gyrus; smooth muscle tissue; mucosa of transverse colon; granulocyte; duodenum; blood; epithelium of colon; primary visual cortex; body of stomach / Top expressed in: seminiferous tubule; spermatid; spermatocyte; interventricular septum; neural layer of retina; yolk sac; dentate gyrus of hippocampal formation granule cell; blastocyst; muscle of thigh; primary visual cortex; More reference expression data
BioGPS	More reference expression data
Gene ontology
Molecular function	protein phosphatase inhibitor activity; protein binding; protein phosphatase 1 binding; protein serine/threonine phosphatase inhibitor activity; ubiquitin protein ligase activity; transferase activity
Cellular component	cytoplasm; protein phosphatase type 1 complex; nucleus
Biological process	negative regulation of phosphoprotein phosphatase activity; defense response to Gram-positive bacterium; protein ubiquitination; ubiquitin-dependent protein catabolic process; negative regulation of protein dephosphorylation
Sources:Amigo / QuickGO
Orthologs
Databases	NCBI: entry; OMA: entry
Species	Human	Mouse
Entrez	6992	76497
Ensembl	ENSG00000234058; ENSG00000236560; ENSG00000237829; ENSG00000204619; ENSG00000237403 ENSG00000233314; ENSG00000206501; ENSG00000227720	ENSMUSG00000036398
UniProt	O60927	Q8K1L5
RefSeq (mRNA)	NM_021959; NM_170781	NM_029632
RefSeq (protein)	NP_068778; NP_068778.1	NP_083908
Location (UCSC)	Chr 6: 30.07 – 30.07 Mb	Chr 17: 37.26 – 37.26 Mb
PubMed search
- Wikidata
View/Edit Human	View/Edit Mouse

Protein phosphatase 1 regulatory subunit 11 is an enzyme that in humans is encoded by the PPP1R11 gene.

This gene encodes a specific inhibitor of protein phosphatase-1 (PP1) with a differential sensitivity toward the metal-independent and metal-dependent forms of PP1.

The gene is located within the major histocompatibility complex class I region on chromosome 6.
