= LMTK2 =

Protein-coding gene in the species Homo sapiens

Identifiers
- Aliases: LMTK2, AATYK2, BREK, KPI-2, KPI2, LMR2, PPP1R100, cprk, hBREK, lemur tyrosine kinase 2
- External IDs: OMIM: 610989; MGI: 3036247; GeneCards: LMTK2
Enzyme activity
EC #	BRENDA	ExPASy	KEGG	MetaCyc
2.7.11.1	↗	↗	↗	↗

Gene location (Human)
Chr.	Chromosome 7 (human)
Band	7q21.3	Start	98,106,862 bp
Band	7q21.3	End	98,209,638 bp

Gene location (Mouse)
Chr.	Chromosome 5 (mouse)
Band	5|5 G2	Start	144,037,254 bp
Band	5|5 G2	End	144,125,022 bp
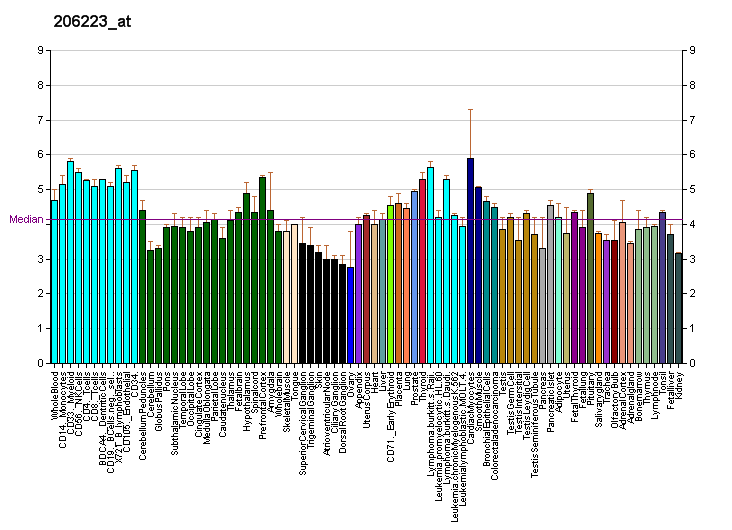
RNA expression pattern
Bgee	Human / Mouse (ortholog); Top expressed in: middle temporal gyrus; Brodmann area 23; parietal lobe; postcentral gyrus; superior frontal gyrus; primary visual cortex; lateral nuclear group of thalamus; pons; parotid gland; Skeletal muscle tissue of rectus abdominis / Top expressed in: Paneth cell; primary motor cortex; cingulate gyrus; prefrontal cortex; olfactory tubercle; piriform cortex; superior colliculus; retinal pigment epithelium; subiculum; inferior colliculi; More reference expression data
BioGPS	More reference expression data
Gene ontology
Molecular function	transferase activity; nucleotide binding; protein kinase activity; kinase activity; myosin VI binding; protein serine/threonine kinase activity; protein binding; protein phosphatase inhibitor activity; ATP binding; receptor tyrosine kinase; transmembrane signaling receptor activity; transmembrane receptor protein tyrosine kinase activity
Cellular component	integral component of membrane; recycling endosome; Golgi apparatus; membrane; early endosome; perinuclear region of cytoplasm; cytosol; growth cone; soma; cytoplasm; integral component of plasma membrane; receptor complex
Biological process	transferrin transport; phosphorylation; protein phosphorylation; early endosome to late endosome transport; receptor recycling; peptidyl-serine phosphorylation; endocytic recycling; protein autophosphorylation; peptidyl-threonine phosphorylation; negative regulation of phosphoprotein phosphatase activity; negative regulation of signal transduction; peptidyl-tyrosine phosphorylation; cell differentiation; negative regulation of apoptotic process; positive regulation of ERK1 and ERK2 cascade; transmembrane receptor protein tyrosine kinase signaling pathway
Sources:Amigo / QuickGO
Orthologs
Databases	NCBI: entry; OMA: entry
Species	Human	Mouse
Entrez	22853	231876
Ensembl	ENSG00000164715	ENSMUSG00000038970
UniProt	Q8IWU2	Q3TYD6
RefSeq (mRNA)	NM_014916	NM_001081109
RefSeq (protein)	NP_055731	NP_001074578
Location (UCSC)	Chr 7: 98.11 – 98.21 Mb	Chr 5: 144.04 – 144.13 Mb
PubMed search
- Wikidata
View/Edit Human	View/Edit Mouse

Serine/threonine-protein kinase LMTK2 also known as Lemur tyrosine kinase 2 (LMTK2) is an enzyme that in humans is encoded by the LMTK2 gene.

== Function ==
The LMTK2 enzyme belongs to both the protein kinase and the tyrosine kinase families. It contains N-terminus transmembrane helices and a long C-terminal cytoplasmic tail with serine/threonine kinase activity. This protein interacts with several other proteins, such as androgen receptor, inhibitor-2 (Inh2), protein phosphatase-1 (PP1C), p35, and myosin VI. It phosphorylates other proteins, and is itself also phosphorylated when interacting with cyclin-dependent kinase 5 (cdk5)/p35 complex. This protein is involved in nerve growth factor (NGF)-TrkA signalling, and also plays a critical role in endosomal membrane trafficking. Mouse studies suggested an essential role of this protein in spermatogenesis.

== Clinical significance ==
Loss of LMTK2 has been implicated to play a role in development of prostate cancer.

== Interactions ==
LMTK2 has been shown to interact with PPP1CA, Cyclin-dependent kinase 5 and PPP1R2.
