= PPP1R1B =

Protein

Identifiers
- Aliases: PPP1R1B, DARPP-32, DARPP32, protein phosphatase 1 regulatory inhibitor subunit 1B
- External IDs: OMIM: 604399; MGI: 94860; GeneCards: PPP1R1B

Gene location (Human)
Chr.	Chromosome 17 (human)
Band	17q12	Start	39,626,740 bp
Band	17q12	End	39,636,626 bp

Gene location (Mouse)
Chr.	Chromosome 11 (mouse)
Band	11|11 D	Start	98,239,230 bp
Band	11|11 D	End	98,248,622 bp
RNA expression pattern
Bgee	Human / Mouse (ortholog); Top expressed in: putamen; caudate nucleus; nucleus accumbens; external globus pallidus; mucosa of ileum; mucosa of transverse colon; rectum; right frontal lobe; amygdala; Brodmann area 9 / Top expressed in: olfactory tubercle; superior frontal gyrus; globus pallidus; nucleus accumbens; parotid gland; primary visual cortex; piriform cortex; Epithelium of choroid plexus; cerebellar cortex; colon; More reference expression data
BioGPS	n/a
Gene ontology
Molecular function	protein serine/threonine phosphatase inhibitor activity; protein kinase inhibitor activity; protein binding; cAMP-dependent protein kinase inhibitor activity; protein phosphatase regulator activity; protein phosphatase inhibitor activity; D1 dopamine receptor binding; D2 dopamine receptor binding; D3 dopamine receptor binding; D4 dopamine receptor binding; D5 dopamine receptor binding
Cellular component	cytoplasm; soma; nucleus; cytosol; dendritic spine neck; dendritic spine head; postsynapse; glutamatergic synapse
Biological process	visual learning; intracellular signal transduction; response to amphetamine; transcription, DNA-templated; negative regulation of female receptivity; signal transduction; negative regulation of protein kinase activity; negative regulation of protein serine/threonine kinase activity; negative regulation of phosphoprotein phosphatase activity; locomotory behavior; response to morphine; behavioral response to cocaine; response to cocaine; memory; response to nicotine
Sources:Amigo / QuickGO
Orthologs
Databases	NCBI: entry; OMA: entry
Species	Human	Mouse
Entrez	84152	19049
Ensembl	ENSG00000131771	ENSMUSG00000061718
UniProt	Q9UD71	Q60829
RefSeq (mRNA)	NM_001242464; NM_032192; NM_181505	NM_144828; NM_001313970
RefSeq (protein)	NP_001229393; NP_115568; NP_852606; NP_115568.2	NP_001300899; NP_659077
Location (UCSC)	Chr 17: 39.63 – 39.64 Mb	Chr 11: 98.24 – 98.25 Mb
PubMed search
- Wikidata
View/Edit Human	View/Edit Mouse

Protein phosphatase 1 regulatory subunit 1B (PPP1R1B), also known as dopamine- and cAMP-regulated neuronal phosphoprotein (DARPP-32), is a protein that in humans is encoded by the PPP1R1B gene.

== Function ==
Midbrain dopaminergic neurons play a critical role in multiple brain functions, and abnormal signaling through dopaminergic pathways has been implicated in several major neurologic and psychiatric disorders. One well studied target for the actions of dopamine is DARPP32. In the densely dopamine- and glutamate-innervated rat caudate-putamen, DARPP32 is expressed in medium-sized spiny neurons that also express dopamine D1 receptors. The function of DARPP32 seems to be regulated by receptor stimulation. Both dopaminergic and glutamatergic (NMDA) receptor stimulation regulate the extent of DARPP32 phosphorylation, but in opposite directions. Dopamine D1 receptor stimulation enhances cAMP formation, resulting in the phosphorylation of DARPP32; (this is disputed by more recent research that claims cAMP signaling induces dephosphorylation of DARPP32) phosphorylated DARPP32 is a potent protein phosphatase-1 (PPP1CA) inhibitor. NMDA receptor stimulation elevates intracellular calcium, which leads to activation of calcineurin and dephosphorylation of phospho-DARPP32, thereby reducing the phosphatase-1 inhibitory activity of DARPP32. DARPP-32 is critical for dopamine dependent striatal synaptic plasticity, possibly by serving as a dopamine-dependent gating mechanism for calcium/CaMKII signaling. It has been predicted that DARPP-32, in conjunction with ARPP-21, could also be involved in setting-up of eligibility trace-like temporal window for striatal postsynaptic signaling.

== Clinical significance ==
=== CNS ===
This gene is also known as DARPP-32, highlighting its role as a dopamine- and cyclic AMP-regulated phosphoprotein. As such PPP1R1B affects dopamine, glutamate and adenosine; and there is some support for a role of the gene in schizophrenia, as well as being involved in the action of drugs including cocaine, amphetamine, nicotine, LSD, caffeine, PCP, ethanol and morphine, and in Parkinson's disease or EPS (Extra-pyramidal symptoms). DARPP-32 levels are decreased in the dorsolateral prefrontal cortex and lymphocytes of both schizophrenia and bipolar disorder patients. This alteration is suggested to be related to the pathology, since antipsychotics do not regulate the expression of DARPP-32.

A considerable proportion of the psychomotor effects of cannabinoids can be accounted for by a signaling cascade in striatal projection neurons involving PKA-dependent phosphorylation of DARPP-32, achieved via modulation of dopamine D2 and adenosine A2A transmission.

PPP1R1B has also been associated with improved transfer of information between the striatum and the prefrontal cortex, suggesting that variants of PPP1R1B can in some circumstances lead to improved and more flexible cognition, while, in the presence of other genetic and environmental factors, it may lead to symptoms of schizophrenia.

=== Cancer ===
There are two protein products encoded by PPP1R1B: DARPP-32 and t-Darpp. t-Darpp is a truncated version of DARPP-32 as it is missing the first 36 amino acids at the N-terminus. Both isoforms are overexpressed in a number of cancers including those derived from gastric, colon, prostate, esophageal, breast, and lung tissues. In Her-2-positive breast cancer cells, t-Darpp overexpression imparts resistance to Trastuzumab (Herceptin), the chemotherapy drug that shuts down the Her-2 signaling pathway.

== Regulation ==
Brain-derived neurotrophic factor regulates the expression of DARPP-32. The Akt and CDK5/p35 intracellular pathway is suggested to be involved on this regulation. Also, neuronal calcium sensor-1 was suggested to modulate the expression of DARPP-32.

== Discovery ==
PPP1R1B was discovered by Paul Greengard and his co-workers.

== Interactive pathway map ==
Click on genes, proteins and metabolites below to link to respective articles. (Note: The interactive pathway map can be edited at WikiPathways: "NicotineDopaminergic_WP1602".)

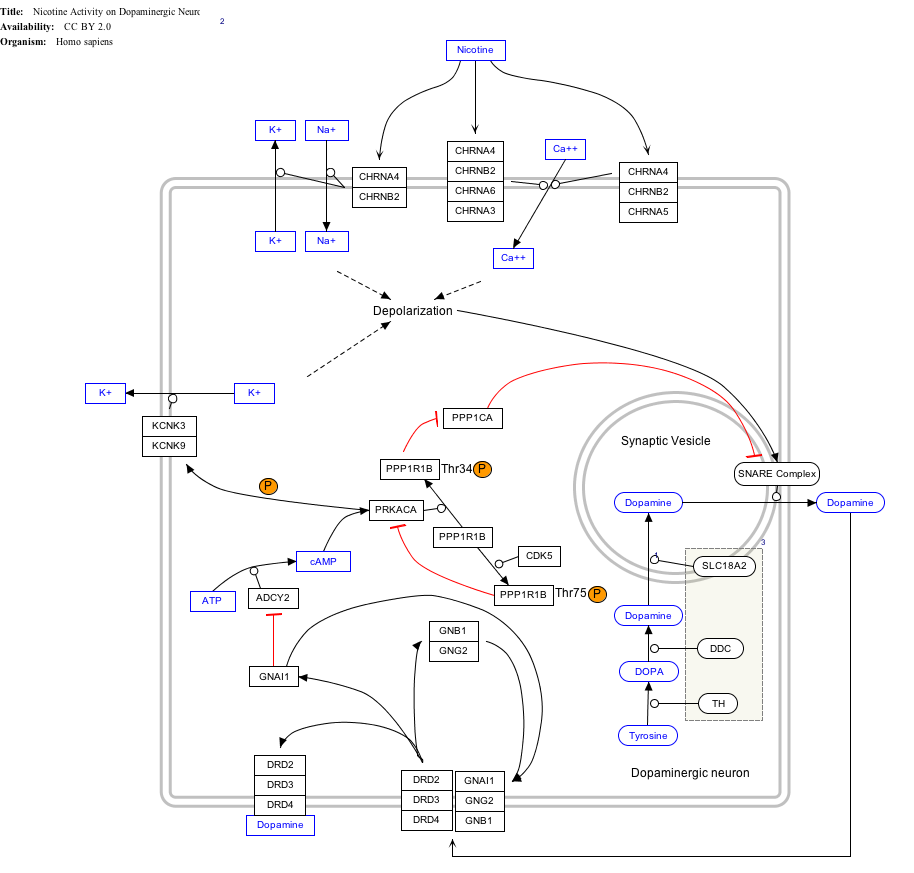

Nicotine Activity on Dopaminergic Neurons edit
