= Cantharidic acid =

Chemical compound

Clinical data
- ATC code: none

Identifiers
- IUPAC name: 2,3-dimethyl-7-oxabicyclo[2.2.1]heptane-2,3-dicarboxylic acid
- CAS Number: 28874-45-5
- PubChem CID: 121475
- ChemSpider: 2448
- UNII: 4LSG5P9GBR
- ChEBI: CHEBI:78695
- ChEMBL: ChEMBL275516
- ECHA InfoCard: 100.164.462

Chemical and physical data
- Formula: C_{10}H_{14}O_{5}
- Molar mass: 214.217 g·mol^{−1}
- 3D model (JSmol): Interactive image
- SMILES: CC1(C2CCC(C1(C)C(=O)O)O2)C(=O)O
- InChI: InChI=1S/C10H14O5/c1-9(7(11)12)5-3-4-6(15-5)10(9,2)8(13)14/h5-6H,3-4H2,1-2H3,(H,11,12)(H,13,14); Key:NMTNUQBORQILRK-UHFFFAOYSA-N

Cantharidic acid is a selective inhibitor of PP2A (protein phosphatase 2) and PP1 (protein phosphatase 1).

It is the hydrolysis product of cantharidin.

== See also ==
- Endothall
