= PPP1R10 =

Protein-coding gene in the species Homo sapiens

Identifiers
- Aliases: PPP1R10, CAT53, FB19, PNUTS, PP1R10, R111, p99, protein phosphatase 1 regulatory subunit 10
- External IDs: OMIM: 603771; MGI: 1289273; GeneCards: PPP1R10

Gene location (Human)
Chr.	Chromosome 6 (human)
Band	6p21.33	Start	30,600,413 bp
Band	6p21.33	End	30,618,612 bp

Gene location (Mouse)
Chr.	Chromosome 17 (mouse)
Band	17 B1|17 18.77 cM	Start	36,227,326 bp
Band	17 B1|17 18.77 cM	End	36,243,175 bp
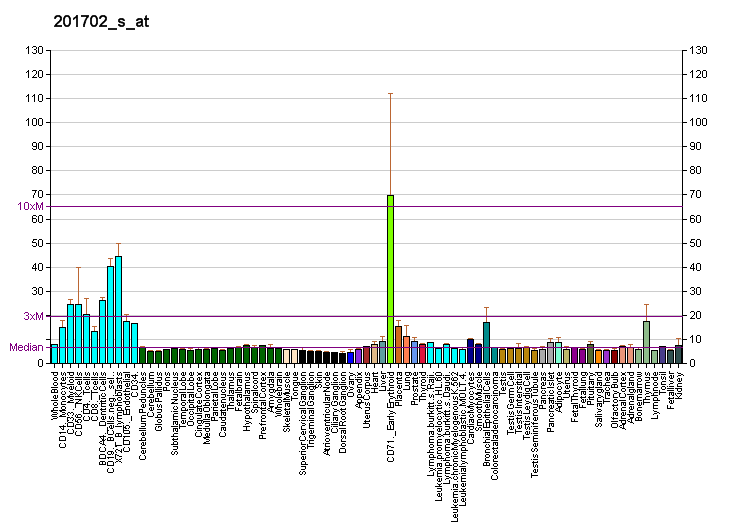

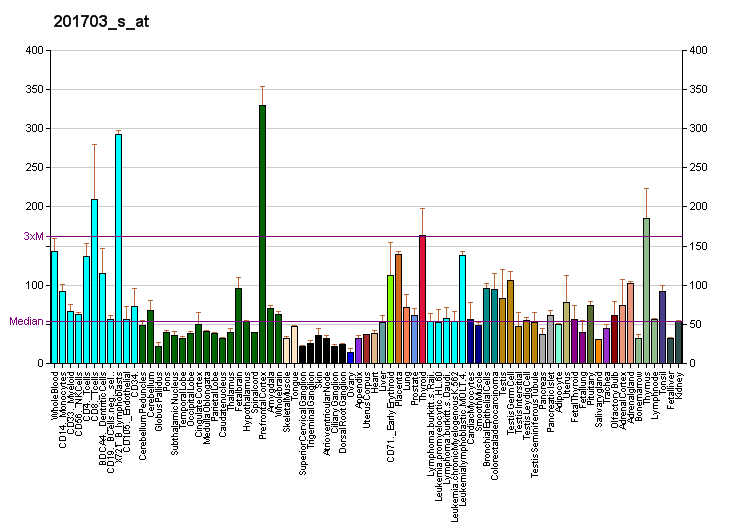
RNA expression pattern
Bgee	Human / Mouse (ortholog); Top expressed in: bone marrow cell; sural nerve; gallbladder; tonsil; granulocyte; appendix; urinary bladder; right uterine tube; rectum; Achilles tendon / Top expressed in: primary oocyte; zygote; tail of embryo; testicle; secondary oocyte; genital tubercle; spermatid; spermatocyte; ventricular zone; uterus; More reference expression data
BioGPS	More reference expression data
Gene ontology
Molecular function	protein phosphatase inhibitor activity; DNA binding; metal ion binding; RNA binding; protein binding
Cellular component	chromatin; PTW/PP1 phosphatase complex; nucleus; nucleoplasm; nuclear body
Biological process	negative regulation of catalytic activity; protein import into nucleus; negative regulation of cardiac muscle cell apoptotic process; positive regulation of telomere maintenance; negative regulation of phosphoprotein phosphatase activity; negative regulation of mitotic DNA damage checkpoint
Sources:Amigo / QuickGO
Orthologs
Databases	NCBI: entry; OMA: entry
Species	Human	Mouse
Entrez	5514	52040
Ensembl	ENSG00000227804; ENSG00000238104; ENSG00000206489; ENSG00000230995; ENSG00000235291 ENSG00000231737; ENSG00000204569	ENSMUSG00000039220
UniProt	Q96QC0	Q80W00
RefSeq (mRNA)	NM_002714; NM_001376195	NM_001163818; NM_175934; NM_001357740
RefSeq (protein)	NP_002705; NP_001363124	NP_001157290; NP_001344669; NP_001390493
Location (UCSC)	Chr 6: 30.6 – 30.62 Mb	Chr 17: 36.23 – 36.24 Mb
PubMed search
- Wikidata
View/Edit Human	View/Edit Mouse

Serine/threonine-protein phosphatase 1 regulatory subunit 10 is an enzyme that in humans is encoded by the PPP1R10 gene. This gene lies within the major histocompatibility complex class I region on chromosome 6.

== Function ==
This gene encodes a protein with similarity to a rat protein that has an inhibitory effect on protein phosphatase-1 (PP1). The rat protein localizes to the nucleus and colocalizes with chromatin at distinct phases during mitosis.
