= PPP1R3G =

Protein-coding gene in the species Homo sapiens

Identifiers
- Aliases: PPP1R3G, protein phosphatase 1 regulatory subunit 3G, PPP1R3AG
- External IDs: MGI: 1923737; GeneCards: PPP1R3G

Gene location (Human)
Chr.	Chromosome 6 (human)
Band	6p25.1	Start	5,085,341 bp
Band	6p25.1	End	5,089,487 bp

Gene location (Mouse)
Chr.	Chromosome 13 (mouse)
Band	13|13 A3.3	Start	36,142,822 bp
Band	13|13 A3.3	End	36,154,371 bp
RNA expression pattern
Bgee	Human / Mouse (ortholog); Top expressed in: apex of heart; left ventricle; right auricle of heart; testicle; right adrenal cortex; popliteal artery; tibial arteries; left adrenal gland; left adrenal cortex; nucleus accumbens / Top expressed in: lumbar subsegment of spinal cord; visual cortex; embryo; primary visual cortex; embryo; superior frontal gyrus; left lobe of liver; dentate gyrus of hippocampal formation granule cell; ventricular zone; gastrula; More reference expression data
BioGPS	n/a
Gene ontology
Molecular function	protein phosphatase binding; glycogen binding
Cellular component	cytoplasm
Biological process	positive regulation of glycogen (starch) synthase activity; positive regulation of glycogen biosynthetic process; glucose homeostasis
Sources:Amigo / QuickGO
Orthologs
Databases	NCBI: entry; OMA: entry
Species	Human	Mouse
Entrez	648791	76487
Ensembl	ENSG00000219607	ENSMUSG00000050423
UniProt	B7ZBB8	Q9CW07
RefSeq (mRNA)	NM_001145115	NM_029628
RefSeq (protein)	NP_001138587	NP_083904
Location (UCSC)	Chr 6: 5.09 – 5.09 Mb	Chr 13: 36.14 – 36.15 Mb
PubMed search
- Wikidata
View/Edit Human	View/Edit Mouse

Protein phosphatase 1 regulatory subunit 3G is a protein that is encoded by the PPP1R3G gene in humans.
