= PPP1R2 =

Protein-coding gene in the species Homo sapiens

Identifiers
- Aliases: PPP1R2, IPP-2, IPP2, protein phosphatase 1 regulatory inhibitor subunit 2, PPP1R2A
- External IDs: OMIM: 601792; MGI: 1914099; GeneCards: PPP1R2
Available structures
| PDB | Ortholog search: PDBe RCSB |
| PDB | List of PDB id codes 2O8A, 2O8G |

Gene location (Human)
| Chr. | Chromosome 3 (human) |
| Band | 3q29 | Start | 195,514,428 bp |
| Band | 3q29 | End | 195,543,386 bp |

Gene location (Mouse)
| Chr. | Chromosome 16 (mouse) |
| Band | 16 B2|16 21.41 cM | Start | 31,070,355 bp |
| Band | 16 B2|16 21.41 cM | End | 31,094,095 bp |
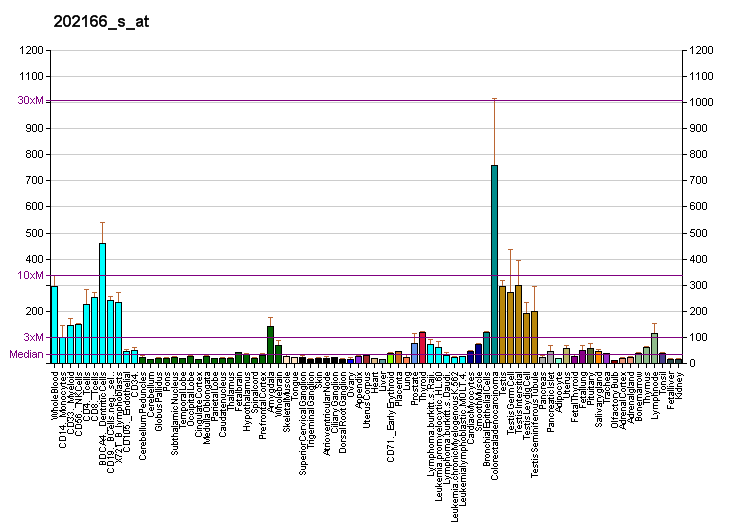

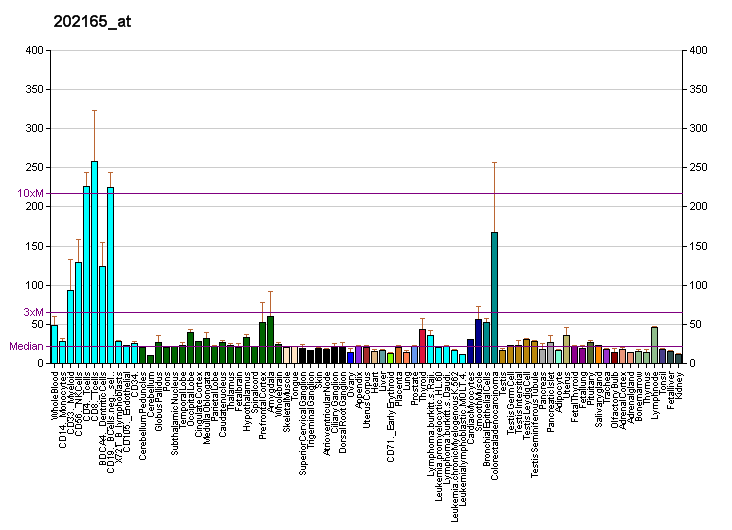
RNA expression pattern
| Bgee | Human / Mouse (ortholog); Top expressed in: biceps brachii; Skeletal muscle tissue of biceps brachii; Skeletal muscle tissue of rectus abdominis; muscle of thigh; sperm; jejunal mucosa; gastrocnemius muscle; bone marrow; vastus lateralis muscle; bone marrow cell / Top expressed in: granulocyte; superior frontal gyrus; tail of embryo; lip; muscle of thigh; spermatocyte; lumbar spinal ganglion; genital tubercle; ventricular zone; aortic valve; More reference expression data |
| BioGPS | More reference expression data |
Gene ontology
| Molecular function | protein serine/threonine phosphatase inhibitor activity; protein phosphatase inhibitor activity; protein binding |
| Cellular component | protein phosphatase type 1 complex |
| Biological process | glycogen metabolic process; regulation of phosphoprotein phosphatase activity; regulation of signal transduction; generation of precursor metabolites and energy; carbohydrate metabolic process; negative regulation of phosphoprotein phosphatase activity |
Sources:Amigo / QuickGO
Orthologs
| Databases | NCBI: entry; OMA: entry |
| Species | Human | Mouse |
| Entrez | 5504 | 66849 |
| Ensembl | ENSG00000184203 | ENSMUSG00000047714 |
| UniProt | P41236 | Q9DCL8 |
| RefSeq (mRNA) | NM_001291504; NM_001291505; NM_006241; NM_001316325 | NM_025800 |
| RefSeq (protein) | NP_001278433; NP_001278434; NP_001303254; NP_006232 | NP_080076 |
| Location (UCSC) | Chr 3: 195.51 – 195.54 Mb | Chr 16: 31.07 – 31.09 Mb |
| PubMed search |
- Wikidata
| View/Edit Human | View/Edit Mouse |

Protein phosphatase inhibitor 2 is an enzyme that in humans is encoded by the PPP1R2 gene.

== Interactions ==
PPP1R2 has been shown to interact with LMTK2 and PPP1R9B.
