= PPP1R9B =

Protein found in humans

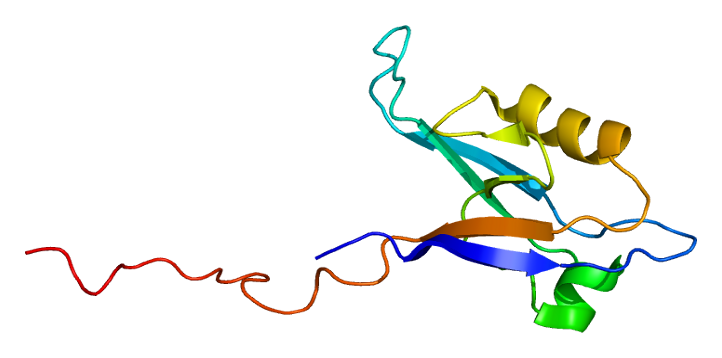

Identifiers
- Aliases: PPP1R9B, PPP1R6, PPP1R9, SPINO, Spn, protein phosphatase 1 regulatory subunit 9B
- External IDs: OMIM: 603325; MGI: 2387581; GeneCards: PPP1R9B

Gene location (Human)
Chr.	Chromosome 17 (human)
Band	17q21.33	Start	50,133,737 bp
Band	17q21.33	End	50,150,677 bp

Gene location (Mouse)
Chr.	Chromosome 11 (mouse)
Band	11|11 D	Start	94,881,861 bp
Band	11|11 D	End	94,897,725 bp
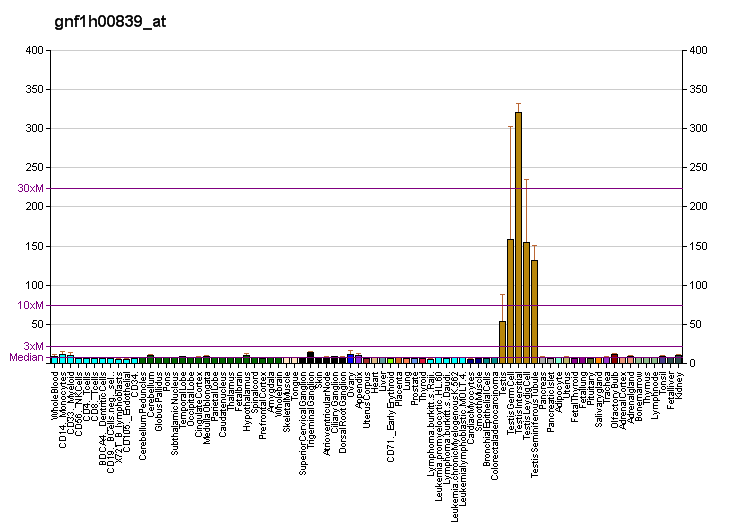

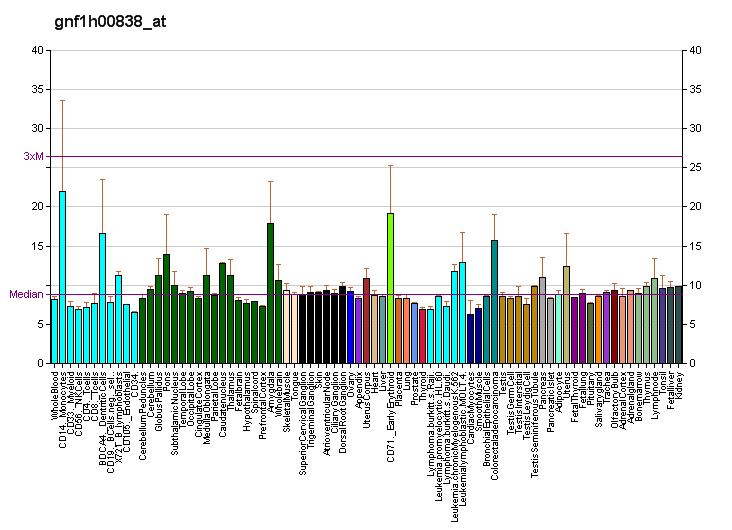
RNA expression pattern
Bgee	Human / Mouse (ortholog); Top expressed in: right hemisphere of cerebellum; granulocyte; cingulate gyrus; anterior cingulate cortex; monocyte; right frontal lobe; amygdala; Brodmann area 9; prefrontal cortex; nucleus accumbens / Top expressed in: dentate gyrus of hippocampal formation granule cell; superior frontal gyrus; primary visual cortex; neural layer of retina; granulocyte; lip; ventricular zone; cerebellar cortex; esophagus; thymus; More reference expression data
BioGPS	More reference expression data
Gene ontology
Molecular function	protein phosphatase 1 binding; protein binding; protein phosphatase inhibitor activity; actin binding; actin filament binding
Cellular component	cytoplasm; cell projection; membrane; filopodium; adherens junction; plasma membrane; dendritic spine; synapse; nucleoplasm; ruffle membrane; cell junction; protein phosphatase type 1 complex; cytoskeleton; nucleus; lamellipodium; postsynaptic density; actin cytoskeleton; dendrite
Biological process	cell differentiation; regulation of opioid receptor signaling pathway; filopodium assembly; regulation of cell growth by extracellular stimulus; modulation of chemical synaptic transmission; nervous system development; multicellular organism development; regulation of cell population proliferation; negative regulation of cell growth; RNA splicing; cellular response to morphine; cell migration; regulation of exit from mitosis; negative regulation of phosphoprotein phosphatase activity; actin filament organization; calcium-mediated signaling; neuron projection development
Sources:Amigo / QuickGO
Orthologs
Databases	NCBI: entry; OMA: entry
Species	Human	Mouse
Entrez	84687	217124
Ensembl	ENSG00000108819	ENSMUSG00000038976
UniProt	Q96SB3	Q6R891
RefSeq (mRNA)	NM_032595	NM_172261
RefSeq (protein)	NP_115984	NP_758465
Location (UCSC)	Chr 17: 50.13 – 50.15 Mb	Chr 11: 94.88 – 94.9 Mb
PubMed search
- Wikidata
View/Edit Human	View/Edit Mouse

Neurabin-2 is a protein that in humans is encoded by the PPP1R9B gene.

Spinophilin is a regulatory subunit of protein phosphatase-1 catalytic subunit (PP1; see MIM 176875) and is highly enriched in dendritic spines, specialized protrusions from dendritic shafts that receive most of the excitatory input in the central nervous system (Allen et al., 1997).[supplied by OMIM]

== Interactions ==
PPP1R9B has been shown to interact with PPP1CB, PPP1CA, Dopamine receptor D2, P16, PPP1CC, T-cell lymphoma invasion and metastasis-inducing protein 1 and PPP1R2.
