= PPP1R15A =

Protein found in humans

Identifiers
- Aliases: PPP1R15A, GADD34, protein phosphatase 1 regulatory subunit 15A
- External IDs: OMIM: 611048; MGI: 1927072; GeneCards: PPP1R15A
Available structures
PDB	Ortholog search: PDBe RCSB
PDB	List of PDB id codes 4XPN

Gene location (Human)
Chr.	Chromosome 19 (human)
Band	19q13.33	Start	48,872,421 bp
Band	19q13.33	End	48,876,058 bp

Gene location (Mouse)
Chr.	Chromosome 7 (mouse)
Band	7|7 B3	Start	45,172,340 bp
Band	7|7 B3	End	45,175,692 bp
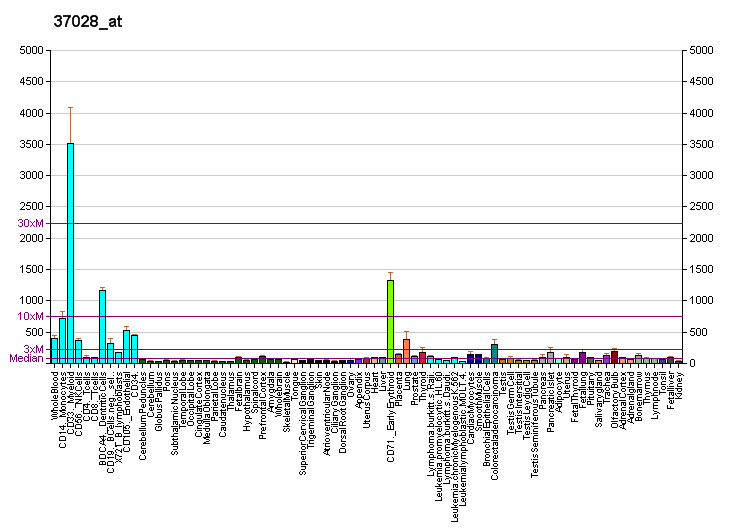

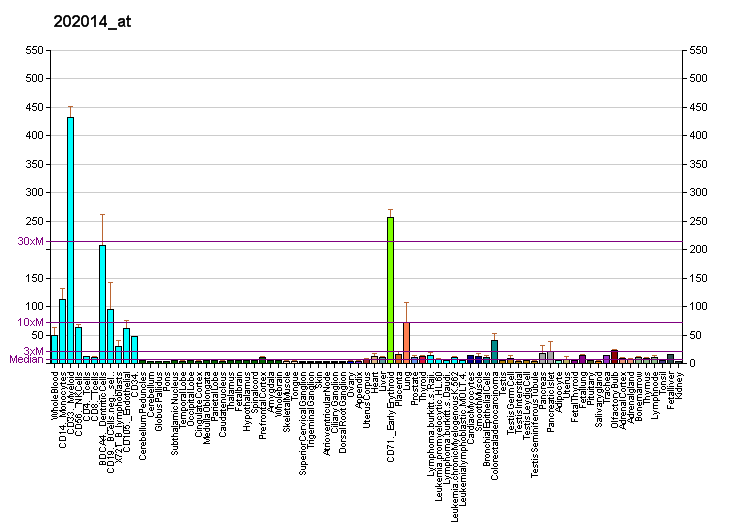
RNA expression pattern
Bgee	Human / Mouse (ortholog); Top expressed in: gastric mucosa; monocyte; vena cava; sural nerve; upper lobe of left lung; granulocyte; skin of abdomen; gallbladder; ascending aorta; olfactory zone of nasal mucosa / Top expressed in: fetal liver hematopoietic progenitor cell; tibiofemoral joint; decidua; granulocyte; muscle of thigh; islet of Langerhans; saccule; spleen; lip; human fetus; More reference expression data
BioGPS	More reference expression data
Gene ontology
Molecular function	protein binding; protein kinase binding; protein phosphatase 1 binding; protein phosphatase activator activity; protein phosphatase regulator activity
Cellular component	Golgi apparatus; endoplasmic reticulum membrane; membrane; mitochondrial outer membrane; protein phosphatase type 1 complex; endoplasmic reticulum; mitochondrion; cytosol; cytoplasm
Biological process	negative regulation of protein dephosphorylation; cellular response to DNA damage stimulus; positive regulation of endoplasmic reticulum stress-induced eIF2 alpha dephosphorylation; positive regulation of translational initiation in response to stress; positive regulation of phosphoprotein phosphatase activity; intrinsic apoptotic signaling pathway in response to endoplasmic reticulum stress; negative regulation of phosphoprotein phosphatase activity; protein localization to endoplasmic reticulum; regulation of translational initiation by eIF2 alpha dephosphorylation; negative regulation of PERK-mediated unfolded protein response; regulation of translation; apoptotic process; response to endoplasmic reticulum stress; positive regulation of peptidyl-serine dephosphorylation
Sources:Amigo / QuickGO
Orthologs
Databases	NCBI: entry; OMA: entry
Species	Human	Mouse
Entrez	23645	17872
Ensembl	ENSG00000087074	ENSMUSG00000040435
UniProt	O75807	P17564
RefSeq (mRNA)	NM_014330	NM_008654
RefSeq (protein)	NP_055145	NP_032680
Location (UCSC)	Chr 19: 48.87 – 48.88 Mb	Chr 7: 45.17 – 45.18 Mb
PubMed search
- Wikidata
View/Edit Human	View/Edit Mouse

Protein phosphatase 1 regulatory subunit 15A, also known as growth arrest and DNA damage-inducible protein (GADD34), is a protein that in humans is encoded by the PPP1R15A gene.

The Gadd34/MyD116 gene was originally discovered as a member in a set of gadd and MyD mammalian genes encoding acidic proteins that synergistically suppress cell growth. Later on it has been characterized as a gene playing a role in ER stress-induced cell death, being a target of ATF4 that plays a role in ER-mediated cell death via promoting protein dephosphorylation of eIF2α and reversing translational inhibition.

== Function ==
This gene is a member of a group of genes whose transcript levels are increased following stressful growth arrest conditions and treatment with DNA-damaging agents. The induction of this gene by ionizing radiation occurs in certain cell lines regardless of p53 status, and its protein response is correlated with apoptosis following ionizing radiation.

== Interactions ==
PPP1R15A has been shown to interact with:

- BAG1
- LYN,
- MLL,
- PPP1CA,
- PPP1CB,
- PPP1CC,
- SMARCB1, and
- TSN.
