= PPP1R3A =

Protein-coding gene in the species Homo sapiens

Identifiers
- Aliases: PPP1R3A, GM, PP1G, PPP1R3, protein phosphatase 1 regulatory subunit 3A
- External IDs: OMIM: 600917; MGI: 2153588; GeneCards: PPP1R3A

Gene location (Human)
Chr.	Chromosome 7 (human)
Band	7q31.1	Start	113,876,777 bp
Band	7q31.1	End	114,075,920 bp

Gene location (Mouse)
Chr.	Chromosome 6 (mouse)
Band	6|6 A1	Start	14,713,976 bp
Band	6|6 A1	End	14,755,273 bp
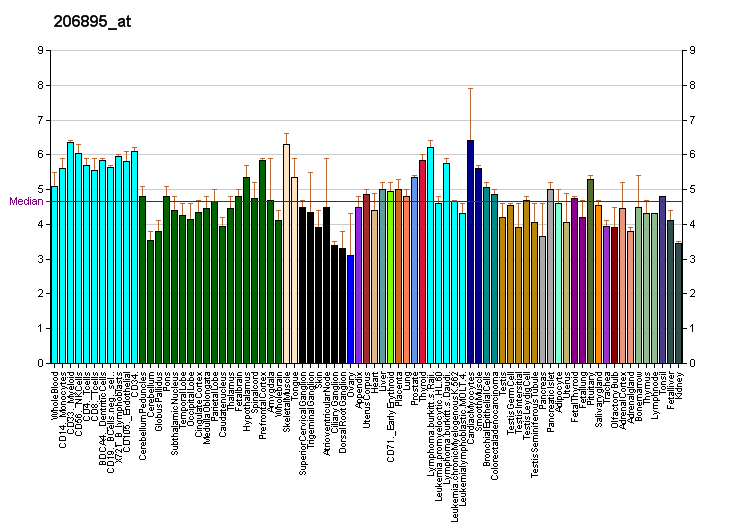

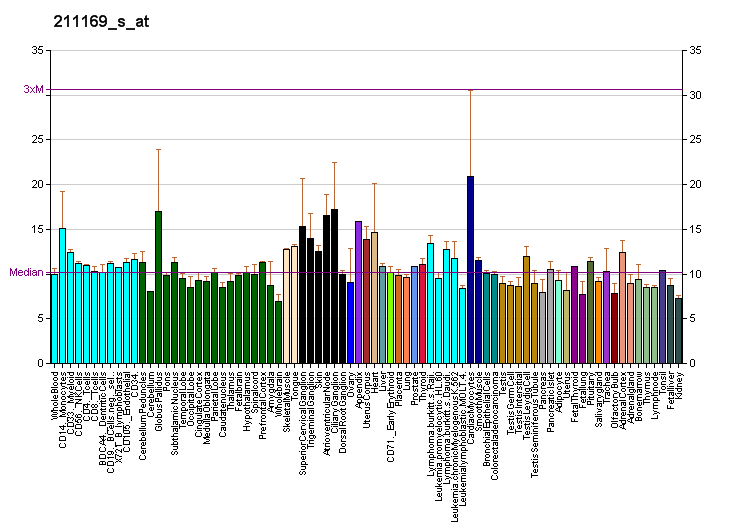
RNA expression pattern
Bgee	Human / Mouse (ortholog); Top expressed in: Skeletal muscle tissue of rectus abdominis; muscle of thigh; Skeletal muscle tissue of biceps brachii; body of tongue; gastrocnemius muscle; vastus lateralis muscle; left ventricle; apex of heart; right auricle of heart; testicle / Top expressed in: interventricular septum; muscle of thigh; right ventricle; skeletal muscle tissue; esophagus; lip; stomach; quadriceps femoris muscle; tibiofemoral joint; carotid body; More reference expression data
BioGPS	More reference expression data
Orthologs
Databases	NCBI: entry; OMA: entry
Species	Human	Mouse
Entrez	5506	140491
Ensembl	ENSG00000154415	ENSMUSG00000042717
UniProt	Q16821	Q99MR9
RefSeq (mRNA)	NM_002711	NM_080464
RefSeq (protein)	NP_002702	NP_536712
Location (UCSC)	Chr 7: 113.88 – 114.08 Mb	Chr 6: 14.71 – 14.76 Mb
PubMed search
- Wikidata
View/Edit Human	View/Edit Mouse

Protein phosphatase 1 regulatory subunit 3A is an enzyme that in humans is encoded by the PPP1R3A gene.

The glycogen-associated form of protein phosphatase-1 (PP1) derived from skeletal muscle is a heterodimer composed of a 37-kD catalytic subunit (MIM 176875) and a 124-kD targeting and regulatory subunit, referred to as PP1G by Hansen et al. (1995).

PP1G binds to muscle glycogen with high affinity, thereby enhancing dephosphorylation of glycogen-bound substrates for PP1 such as glycogen synthase (e.g., MIM 138570) and glycogen phosphorylase kinase (e.g., MIM 306000). Phosphorylation at ser46 of the PP1G subunit in response to insulin increases PP1 activity, while phosphorylation at ser65 in response to adrenaline causes dissociation of the catalytic subunit from the G subunit and inhibits glycogen synthesis.

Because of these functions, PP1G was postulated to be involved in noninsulin-dependent diabetes mellitus (NIDDM; MIM 125853) and obesity.[supplied by OMIM] }}
