= PPP1CB =

Protein-coding gene in the species Homo sapiens

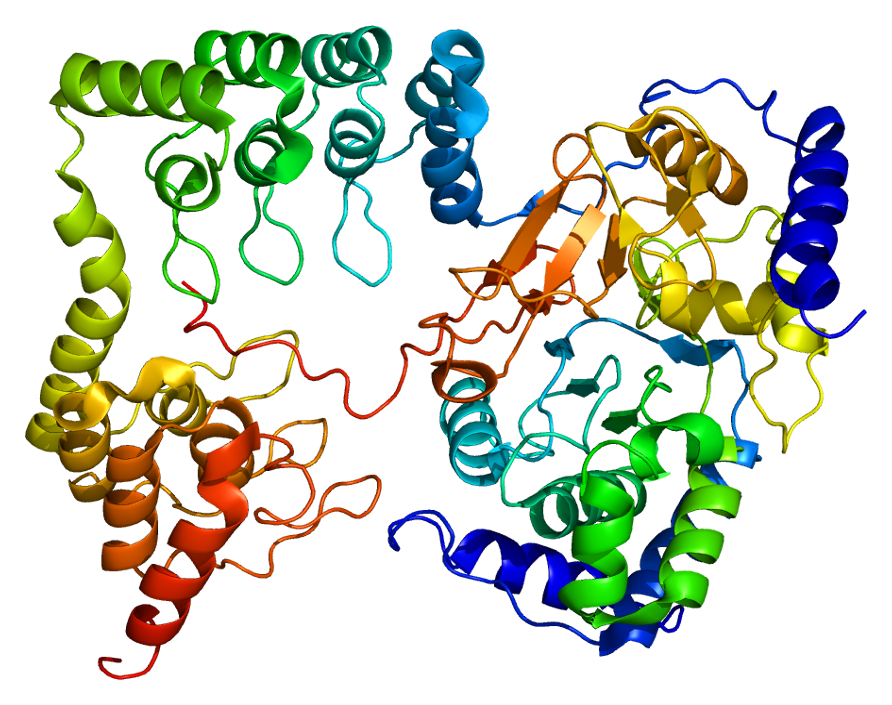

Identifiers
- Aliases: PPP1CB, HEL-S-80p, PP-1B, PP1B, PP1beta, PPP1CD, protein phosphatase 1 catalytic subunit beta, NSLH2, PPP1beta, PP1c, MP
- External IDs: OMIM: 600590; MGI: 104871; GeneCards: PPP1CB
Enzyme activity
EC #	BRENDA	ExPASy	KEGG	MetaCyc
3.1.3.16	↗	↗	↗	↗
3.1.3.53	↗	↗	↗	↗

Gene location (Human)
Chr.	Chromosome 2 (human)
Band	2p23.2	Start	28,751,640 bp
Band	2p23.2	End	28,802,940 bp

Gene location (Mouse)
Chr.	Chromosome 5 (mouse)
Band	5|5 B1	Start	32,616,187 bp
Band	5|5 B1	End	32,674,777 bp
RNA expression pattern
Bgee	Human / Mouse (ortholog); Top expressed in: Achilles tendon; amniotic fluid; buccal mucosa cell; ventricular zone; Descending thoracic aorta; popliteal artery; tibial arteries; ascending aorta; caput epididymis; ganglionic eminence / Top expressed in: blood; Gonadal ridge; atrium; lobe of cerebellum; pineal gland; olfactory tubercle; ventral tegmental area; medial vestibular nucleus; cerebellar vermis; parotid gland; More reference expression data
BioGPS	n/a
Gene ontology
Molecular function	phosphoprotein phosphatase activity; myosin phosphatase activity; phosphatase activity; protein serine/threonine phosphatase activity; metal ion binding; myosin-light-chain-phosphatase activity; protein binding; protein kinase binding; hydrolase activity
Cellular component	cytoplasm; cytosol; focal adhesion; nucleoplasm; protein phosphatase type 1 complex; glycogen granule; PTW/PP1 phosphatase complex; nucleolus; extracellular exosome; nucleus; plasma membrane
Biological process	rhythmic process; protein dephosphorylation; circadian regulation of gene expression; cell division; regulation of cell adhesion; G2/M transition of mitotic cell cycle; regulation of circadian rhythm; glycogen metabolic process; regulation of glycogen biosynthetic process; cell cycle; regulation of glycogen catabolic process; entrainment of circadian clock by photoperiod; carbohydrate metabolic process
Sources:Amigo / QuickGO
Orthologs
Databases	NCBI: entry; OMA: entry
Species	Human	Mouse
Entrez	5500	19046
Ensembl	ENSG00000213639	ENSMUSG00000014956
UniProt	P62140	P62141
RefSeq (mRNA)	NM_206877; NM_002709; NM_206876	NM_172707
RefSeq (protein)	NP_002700; NP_996759	NP_766295
Location (UCSC)	Chr 2: 28.75 – 28.8 Mb	Chr 5: 32.62 – 32.67 Mb
PubMed search
- Wikidata
View/Edit Human	View/Edit Mouse

Serine/threonine-protein phosphatase PP1-beta catalytic subunit is an enzyme that in humans is encoded by the PPP1CB gene.

The protein encoded by this gene is one of the three catalytic subunits of protein phosphatase 1 (PP1). PP1 is a serine/threonine specific protein phosphatase known to be involved in the regulation of a variety of cellular processes, such as cell division, glycogen metabolism, muscle contractility, protein synthesis, and HIV-1 viral transcription. Mouse studies suggest that PP1 functions as a suppressor of learning and memory. Two alternatively spliced transcript variants encoding distinct isoforms have been observed.

== Interactions ==
PPP1CB has been shown to interact with PPP1R15A, Nucleolin, SMARCB1 and PPP1R9B.
