= PPP1R7 =

Protein-coding gene in the species Homo sapiens

Identifiers
- Aliases: PPP1R7, SDS22, protein phosphatase 1 regulatory subunit 7
- External IDs: OMIM: 602877; MGI: 1913635; GeneCards: PPP1R7

Gene location (Human)
Chr.	Chromosome 2 (human)
Band	2q37.3	Start	241,149,576 bp
Band	2q37.3	End	241,183,652 bp

Gene location (Mouse)
Chr.	Chromosome 1 (mouse)
Band	1|1 D	Start	93,270,576 bp
Band	1|1 D	End	93,301,211 bp
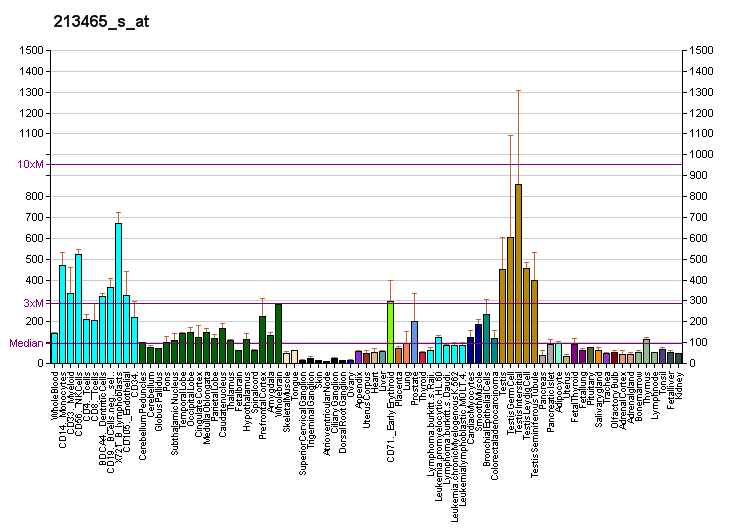

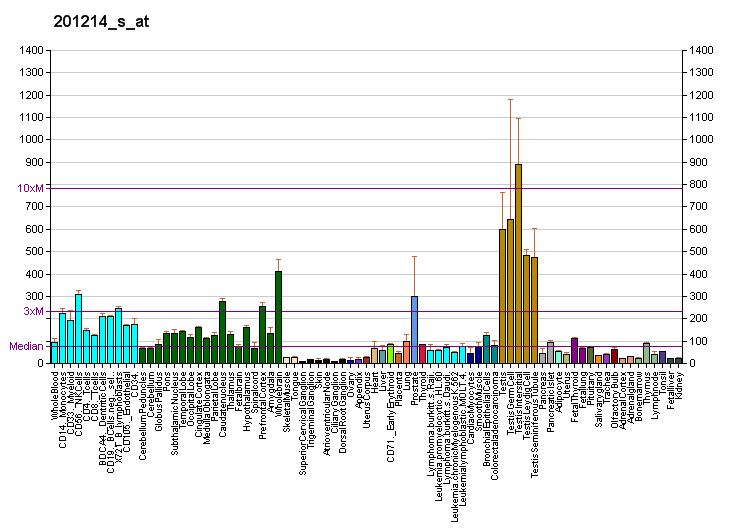

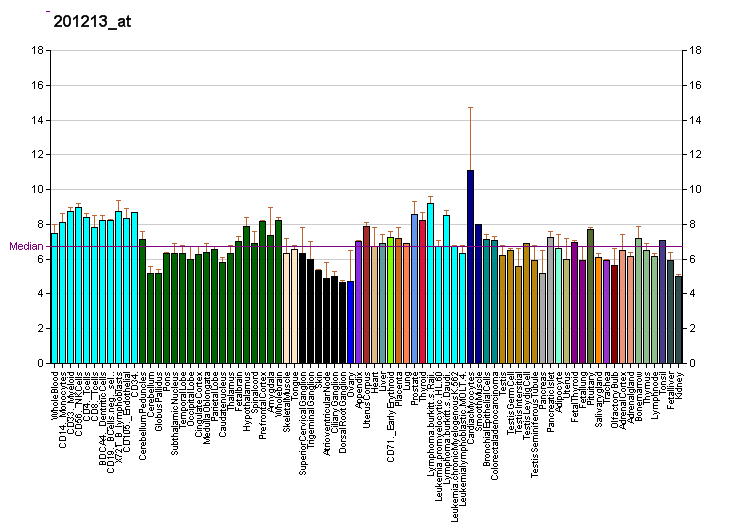
RNA expression pattern
Bgee	Human / Mouse (ortholog); Top expressed in: right testis; left testis; nucleus accumbens; caudate nucleus; putamen; olfactory zone of nasal mucosa; sperm; right frontal lobe; right uterine tube; prefrontal cortex / Top expressed in: tail of embryo; dorsal striatum; olfactory tubercle; nucleus accumbens; genital tubercle; cingulate gyrus; seminiferous tubule; primitive streak; Region I of hippocampus proper; dentate gyrus of hippocampal formation granule cell; More reference expression data
BioGPS	More reference expression data
Gene ontology
Molecular function	enzyme regulator activity; protein binding; protein phosphatase regulator activity
Cellular component	cytoplasm; extracellular exosome; nucleus; chromosome
Biological process	positive regulation of protein dephosphorylation; chromosome segregation; regulation of catalytic activity; regulation of phosphoprotein phosphatase activity; calcium activated phospholipid scrambling
Sources:Amigo / QuickGO
Orthologs
Databases	NCBI: entry; OMA: entry
Species	Human	Mouse
Entrez	5510	66385
Ensembl	ENSG00000115685	ENSMUSG00000026275
UniProt	Q15435	Q3UM45
RefSeq (mRNA)	NM_001282409; NM_001282410; NM_001282411; NM_001282412; NM_001282413 NM_001282414; NM_002712	NM_023200
RefSeq (protein)	NP_001269338; NP_001269339; NP_001269340; NP_001269341; NP_001269342 NP_001269343; NP_002703	NP_075689
Location (UCSC)	Chr 2: 241.15 – 241.18 Mb	Chr 1: 93.27 – 93.3 Mb
PubMed search
- Wikidata
View/Edit Human	View/Edit Mouse

Protein phosphatase 1 regulatory subunit 7 is an enzyme that in humans is encoded by the PPP1R7 gene.
