= PPP1CA =

Enzyme

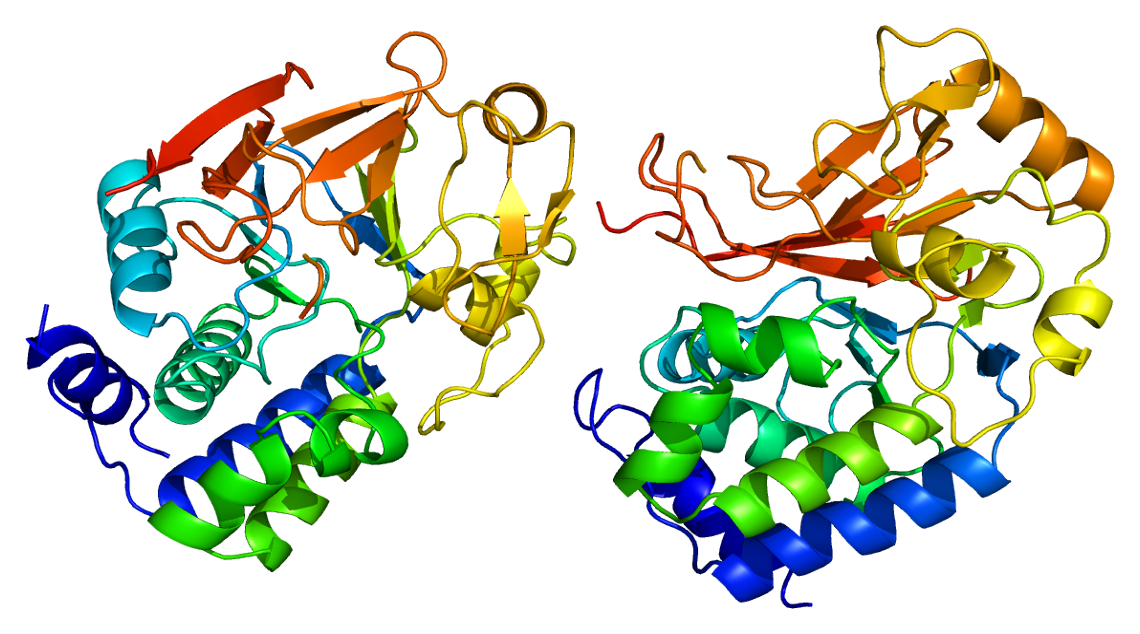

Identifiers
- Aliases: PPP1CA, PP-1A, PP1A, PP1alpha, PPP1A, protein phosphatase 1 catalytic subunit alpha
- External IDs: OMIM: 176875; MGI: 103016; GeneCards: PPP1CA
Available structures
PDB	Ortholog search: PDBe RCSB
PDB	List of PDB id codes 3E7A, 3E7B, 3EGG, 3EGH, 3HVQ, 3N5U, 3V4Y, 4G9J, 4MOV, 4MOY, 4MP0, 4XPN, 1FJM
Enzyme activity
EC #	BRENDA	ExPASy	KEGG	MetaCyc
3.1.3.16	↗	↗	↗	↗

Gene location (Human)
Chr.	Chromosome 11 (human)
Band	11q13.2	Start	67,398,181 bp
Band	11q13.2	End	67,421,183 bp

Gene location (Mouse)
Chr.	Chromosome 19 (mouse)
Band	19|19 A	Start	4,242,064 bp
Band	19|19 A	End	4,245,419 bp
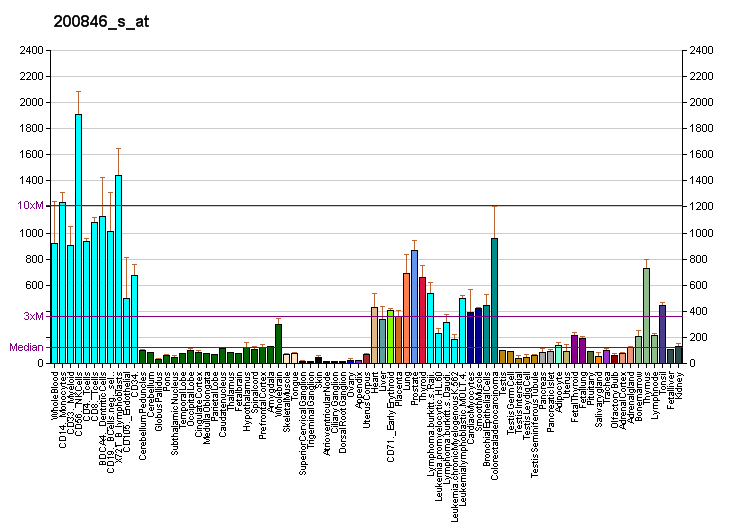
RNA expression pattern
Bgee	Human / Mouse (ortholog); Top expressed in: granulocyte; mucosa of transverse colon; monocyte; spleen; thymus; apex of heart; blood; lymph node; mucosa of pharynx; human penis / Top expressed in: striatum of neuraxis; tail of embryo; granulocyte; yolk sac; neural tube; thymus; mesencephalon; white adipose tissue; epiblast; olfactory bulb; More reference expression data
BioGPS	More reference expression data
Gene ontology
Molecular function	phosphoprotein phosphatase activity; metal ion binding; protein binding; hydrolase activity; cadherin binding involved in cell-cell adhesion; protein serine/threonine phosphatase activity; phosphatase activity; protein phosphatase 1 binding; ribonucleoprotein complex binding; protein-containing complex binding
Cellular component	cytoplasm; plasma membrane; nucleoplasm; PTW/PP1 phosphatase complex; nucleolus; extracellular exosome; nucleus; cytosol; protein phosphatase type 1 complex; glycogen granule; neuron projection; soma; dendritic spine; perikaryon; presynapse; postsynapse; glutamatergic synapse
Biological process	regulation of canonical Wnt signaling pathway; negative regulation of protein binding; cell division; glycogen metabolic process; cell cycle; regulation of translational initiation by eIF2 alpha dephosphorylation; beta-catenin destruction complex disassembly; dephosphorylation; cell-cell adhesion; protein dephosphorylation; circadian regulation of gene expression; regulation of circadian rhythm; entrainment of circadian clock by photoperiod; carbohydrate metabolic process; regulation of glycogen biosynthetic process; regulation of glycogen catabolic process; response to lead ion; lung development; peptidyl-threonine dephosphorylation; branching morphogenesis of an epithelial tube; peptidyl-serine dephosphorylation; positive regulation of extrinsic apoptotic signaling pathway in absence of ligand; viral process
Sources:Amigo / QuickGO
Orthologs
Databases	NCBI: entry; OMA: entry
Species	Human	Mouse
Entrez	5499	19045
Ensembl	ENSG00000172531	ENSMUSG00000040385
UniProt	P62136	P62137
RefSeq (mRNA)	NM_206873; NM_001008709; NM_002708	NM_031868
RefSeq (protein)	NP_001008709; NP_002699; NP_996756	NP_114074
Location (UCSC)	Chr 11: 67.4 – 67.42 Mb	Chr 19: 4.24 – 4.25 Mb
PubMed search
- Wikidata
View/Edit Human	View/Edit Mouse

Serine/threonine-protein phosphatase PP1-alpha catalytic subunit is an enzyme that in humans is encoded by the PPP1CA gene.

== Function ==
The protein encoded by this gene is one of the three catalytic subunits of protein phosphatase 1 (PP1). PP1 is a serine/threonine specific protein phosphatase known to be involved in the regulation of a variety of cellular processes, such as cell division, glycogen metabolism, muscle contractility, protein synthesis, and HIV-1 viral transcription. Increased PP1 activity has been observed in the end stage of heart failure. Studies in both human and mice suggest that PP1 is an important regulator of cardiac function. Three alternatively spliced transcript variants encoding different isoforms have been found for this gene.

== Interactive pathway map ==
Click on genes, proteins and metabolites below to link to respective articles. (Note: The interactive pathway map can be edited at WikiPathways: "NicotineDopaminergic_WP1602".)

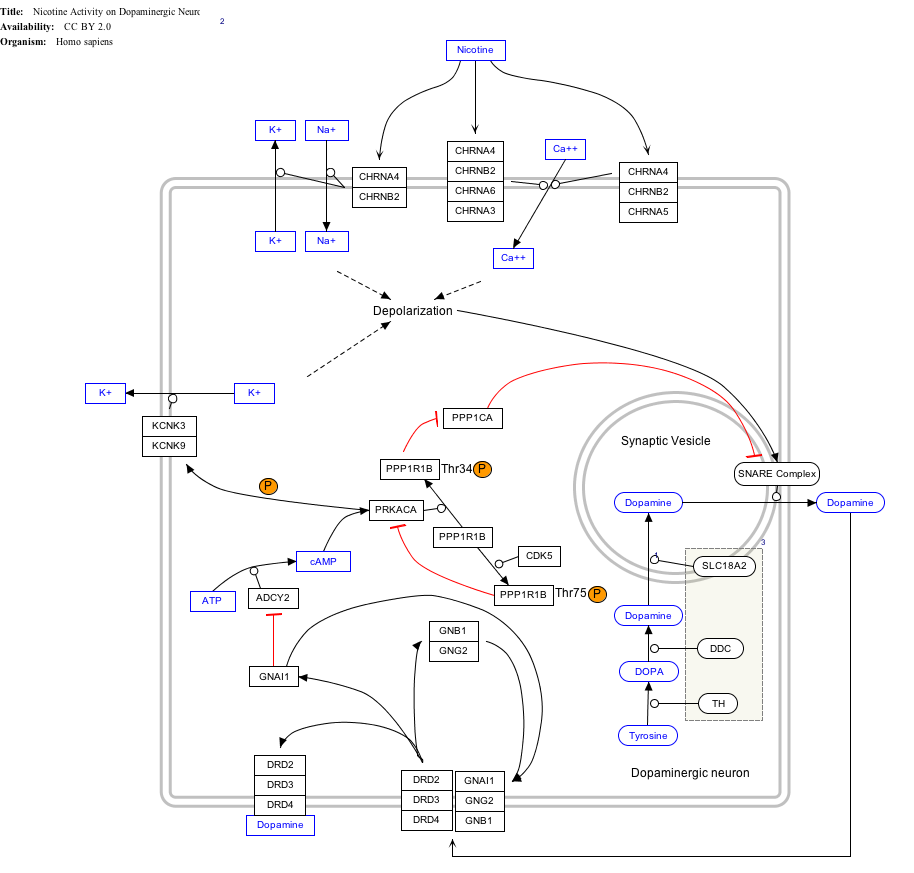

Nicotine Activity on Dopaminergic Neurons edit

== Interactions ==
PPP1CA has been shown to interact with:

- AKAP11,
- BCL2-like 1,
- BCL2L2,
- BRCA1,
- CDC5L,
- Host cell factor C1,
- KvLQT1,
- LMTK2,
- PHACTR3,
- PPP1R15A,
- PPP1R8,
- PPP1R9B,
- Protein kinase R, and
- SMARCB1.
