= PPP1R14B =

Protein-coding gene in the species Homo sapiens

Identifiers
- Aliases: PPP1R14B, PHI-1, PLCB3N, PNG, SOM172, protein phosphatase 1 regulatory inhibitor subunit 14B
- External IDs: OMIM: 601140; MGI: 107682; GeneCards: PPP1R14B

Gene location (Human)
Chr.	Chromosome 11 (human)
Band	11q13.1	Start	64,244,479 bp
Band	11q13.1	End	64,246,943 bp

Gene location (Mouse)
Chr.	Chromosome 19 (mouse)
Band	19|19 A	Start	6,952,336 bp
Band	19|19 A	End	6,954,692 bp
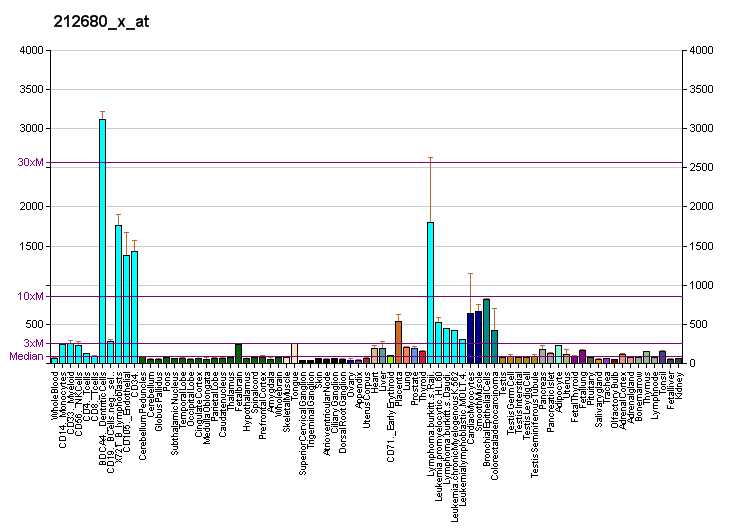
RNA expression pattern
Bgee	Human / Mouse (ortholog); Top expressed in: ganglionic eminence; body of pancreas; right coronary artery; stromal cell of endometrium; apex of heart; muscle of thigh; mucosa of transverse colon; skin of abdomen; skin of leg; gastrocnemius muscle / Top expressed in: ventricular zone; lip; esophagus; yolk sac; muscle of thigh; nucleus pulposus; zygote; spermatid; embryo; embryo; More reference expression data
BioGPS	More reference expression data
Gene ontology
Molecular function	protein phosphatase inhibitor activity; phosphatase inhibitor activity; protein phosphatase regulator activity; protein serine/threonine phosphatase inhibitor activity
Cellular component	cytoplasm
Biological process	regulation of phosphorylation; innate immune response; negative regulation of phosphoprotein phosphatase activity; negative regulation of catalytic activity; regulation of phosphoprotein phosphatase activity
Sources:Amigo / QuickGO
Orthologs
Databases	NCBI: entry; OMA: entry
Species	Human	Mouse
Entrez	26472	18938
Ensembl	ENSG00000173457	ENSMUSG00000056612
UniProt	Q96C90	Q62084
RefSeq (mRNA)	NM_138689	NM_008889
RefSeq (protein)	NP_619634	NP_032915
Location (UCSC)	Chr 11: 64.24 – 64.25 Mb	Chr 19: 6.95 – 6.95 Mb
PubMed search
- Wikidata
View/Edit Human	View/Edit Mouse

Protein phosphatase 1 regulatory subunit 14B is an enzyme that in humans is encoded by the PPP1R14B gene.
