= PPP1CC =

Protein-coding gene in the species Homo sapiens

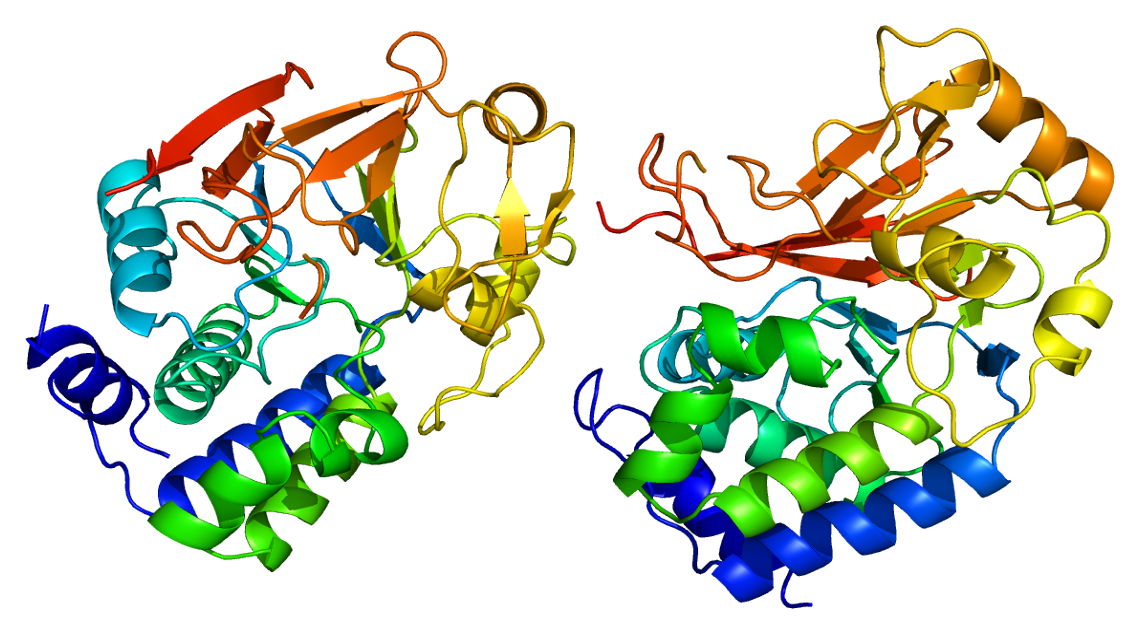

Identifiers
- Aliases: PPP1CC, PP-1G, PP1C, PPP1G, protein phosphatase 1 catalytic subunit gamma
- External IDs: OMIM: 176914; MGI: 3647492; GeneCards: PPP1CC
Available structures
| PDB | Ortholog search: PDBe RCSB |
| PDB | List of PDB id codes 1IT6, 1JK7, 1U32, 2BCD, 2BDX, 4UT2, 4UT3 |
Enzyme activity
| EC # | BRENDA | ExPASy | KEGG | MetaCyc |
|---|---|---|---|---|
| 3.1.3.16 | ↗ | ↗ | ↗ | ↗ |

Gene location (Human)
| Chr. | Chromosome 12 (human) |
| Band | 12q24.11 | Start | 110,719,680 bp |
| Band | 12q24.11 | End | 110,742,939 bp |

Gene location (Mouse)
| Chr. | Chromosome 5 (mouse) |
| Band | 7|7 F2 | Start | 122,158,278 bp |
| Band | 7|7 F2 | End | 122,175,273 bp |
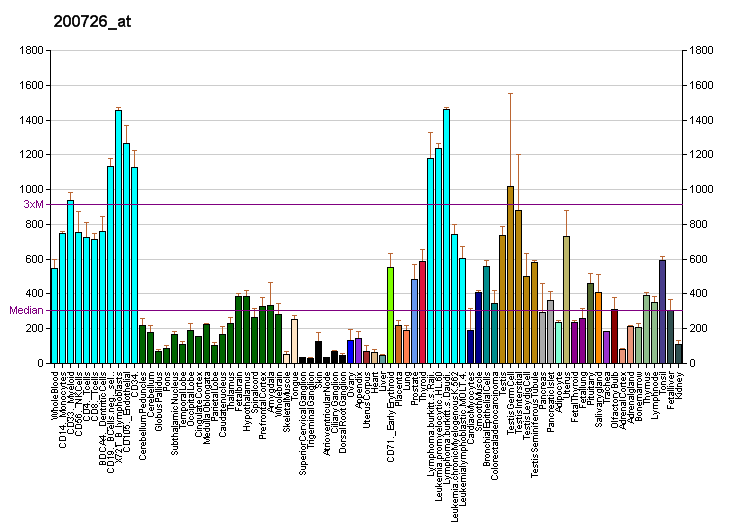
RNA expression pattern
| Bgee | Human / Mouse (ortholog); Top expressed in: jejunal mucosa; right ventricle; parotid gland; Skeletal muscle tissue of biceps brachii; secondary oocyte; superficial temporal artery; duodenum; male germ cell; skin of hip; sperm / Top expressed in: neural layer of retina; spermatocyte; spermatid; genital tubercle; epiblast; tail of embryo; olfactory bulb; ventricular zone; ganglionic eminence; thymus; More reference expression data |
| BioGPS | More reference expression data |
Gene ontology
| Molecular function | phosphoprotein phosphatase activity; protein domain specific binding; protein N-terminus binding; phosphatase activity; protein-containing complex binding; protein serine/threonine phosphatase activity; metal ion binding; protein phosphatase 1 binding; protein C-terminus binding; protein binding; protein phosphatase binding; hydrolase activity; protein kinase binding; lamin binding; RNA binding |
| Cellular component | cytoplasm; cytosol; nuclear speck; focal adhesion; dendritic spine; chromosome; nucleoplasm; mitochondrial outer membrane; midbody; PTW/PP1 phosphatase complex; nucleolus; mitochondrion; cleavage furrow; chromosome, centromeric region; nucleus; kinetochore; protein phosphatase type 1 complex; protein-containing complex; presynapse; postsynapse; glutamatergic synapse |
| Biological process | regulation of nucleocytoplasmic transport; rhythmic process; protein dephosphorylation; circadian regulation of gene expression; cell division; regulation of circadian rhythm; neuron differentiation; glycogen metabolic process; cell cycle; entrainment of circadian clock by photoperiod; sister chromatid cohesion; carbohydrate metabolic process; positive regulation of glial cell proliferation |
Sources:Amigo / QuickGO
Orthologs
| Databases | NCBI: entry; OMA: entry |
| Species | Human | Mouse |
| Entrez | 5501 | 434233 |
| Ensembl | ENSG00000186298 | ENSMUSG00000004455 |
| UniProt | P36873 | P63087 |
| RefSeq (mRNA) | NM_001244974; NM_002710 | XM_006508415 |
| RefSeq (protein) | NP_001231903; NP_002701 | NP_038664 |
| Location (UCSC) | Chr 12: 110.72 – 110.74 Mb | Chr 5: 122.16 – 122.18 Mb |
| PubMed search |
- Wikidata
| View/Edit Human | View/Edit Mouse |

Serine/threonine-protein phosphatase PP1-gamma catalytic subunit is an enzyme that in humans is encoded by the PPP1CC gene.

== Interactions ==
PPP1CC has been shown to interact with PPP1R15A, SMARCB1, TLX1 and PPP1R9B.
