= DMWD (gene) =

Protein-coding gene in the species Homo sapiens

Identifiers
- Aliases: DMWD, D19S593E, DMR-N9, DMRN9, gene59, dystrophia myotonica, WD repeat containing, DM1 locus, WD repeat containing
- External IDs: OMIM: 609857; MGI: 94907; GeneCards: DMWD

Gene location (Human)
Chr.	Chromosome 19 (human)
Band	19q13.32	Start	45,782,947 bp
Band	19q13.32	End	45,792,845 bp

Gene location (Mouse)
Chr.	Chromosome 7 (mouse)
Band	7 A3|7 9.46 cM	Start	18,810,152 bp
Band	7 A3|7 9.46 cM	End	18,816,701 bp
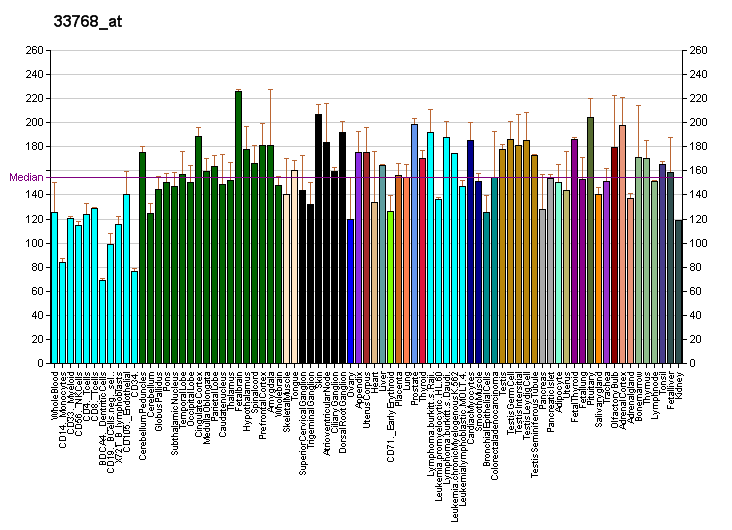

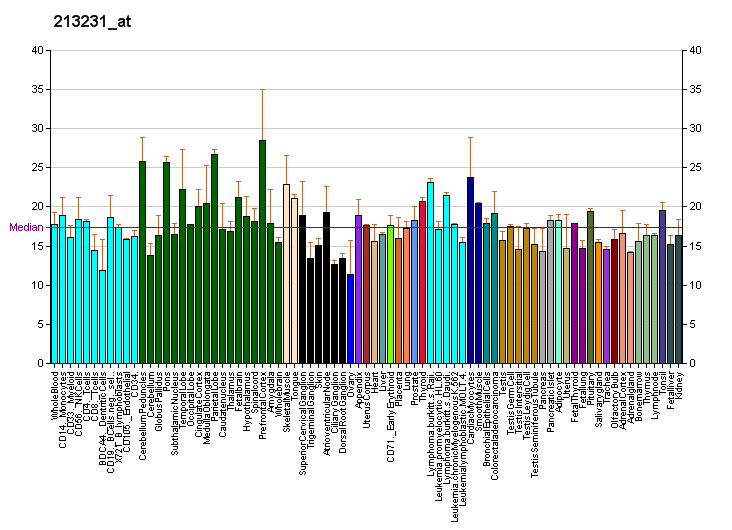
RNA expression pattern
Bgee	Human / Mouse (ortholog); Top expressed in: apex of heart; popliteal artery; tibial arteries; right auricle of heart; right coronary artery; gastrocnemius muscle; right frontal lobe; body of uterus; Descending thoracic aorta; gastric mucosa / Top expressed in: Rostral migratory stream; subiculum; granulocyte; dentate gyrus of hippocampal formation granule cell; epithelium of lens; superior frontal gyrus; otic vesicle; nucleus accumbens; retinal pigment epithelium; prefrontal cortex; More reference expression data
BioGPS	More reference expression data
Gene ontology
Molecular function	molecular function
Cellular component	nucleus; dendrite; cell projection; perikaryon; cellular component
Biological process	protein deubiquitination
Sources:Amigo / QuickGO
Orthologs
Databases	NCBI: entry; OMA: entry
Species	Human	Mouse
Entrez	1762	13401
Ensembl	ENSG00000185800	ENSMUSG00000030410
UniProt	Q09019	Q08274
RefSeq (mRNA)	NM_004943	NM_010058; NM_001374607
RefSeq (protein)	NP_004934	NP_034188; NP_001361536
Location (UCSC)	Chr 19: 45.78 – 45.79 Mb	Chr 7: 18.81 – 18.82 Mb
PubMed search
- Wikidata
View/Edit Human	View/Edit Mouse

Dystrophia myotonica WD repeat-containing protein is a protein that in humans is encoded by the DMWD gene.
