= PPP1R14C =

Protein-coding gene in the species Homo sapiens

Identifiers
- Aliases: PPP1R14C, CPI17-like, KEPI, NY-BR-81, protein phosphatase 1 regulatory inhibitor subunit 14C
- External IDs: OMIM: 613242; MGI: 1923392; GeneCards: PPP1R14C

Gene location (Human)
Chr.	Chromosome 6 (human)
Band	6q25.1	Start	150,143,044 bp
Band	6q25.1	End	150,250,392 bp

Gene location (Mouse)
Chr.	Chromosome 10 (mouse)
Band	10|10 A1	Start	3,316,057 bp
Band	10|10 A1	End	3,414,975 bp
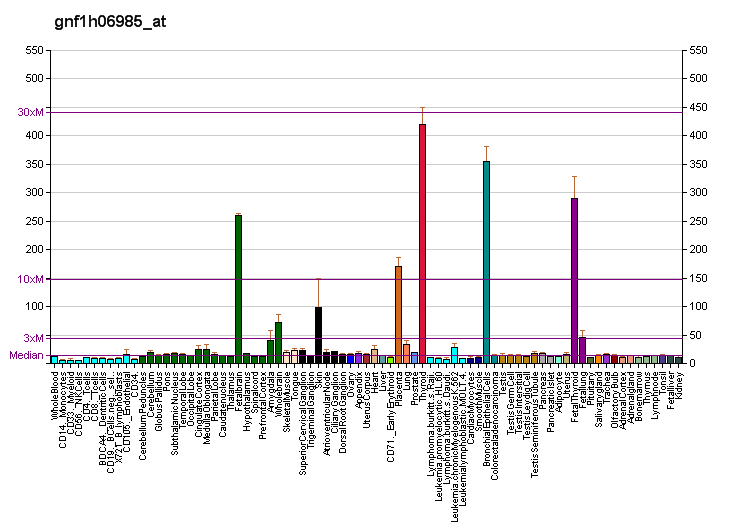

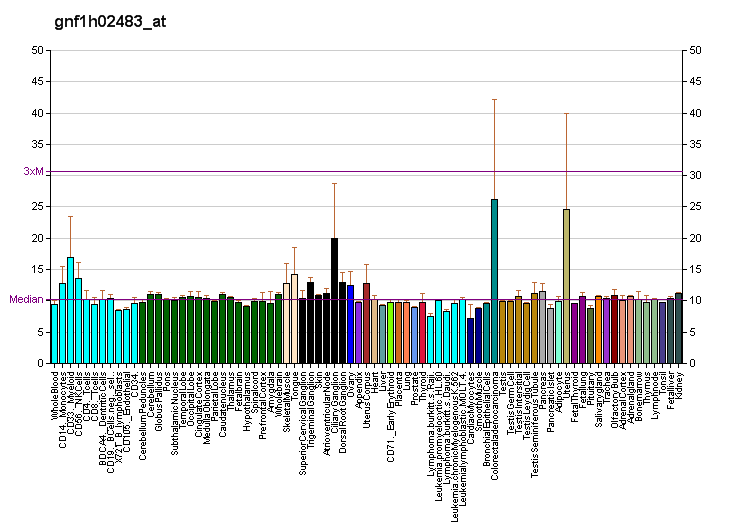
RNA expression pattern
Bgee	Human / Mouse (ortholog); Top expressed in: skin of arm; cardiac muscle tissue of right atrium; myocardium of left ventricle; secondary oocyte; cartilage tissue; bronchial epithelial cell; Skeletal muscle tissue of rectus abdominis; skin of thigh; skin of abdomen; skin of hip / Top expressed in: interventricular septum; left ventricle; quadriceps femoris muscle; muscle tissue; skeletal muscle tissue; muscle of thigh; lung; zone of skin; lip; ganglionic eminence; More reference expression data
BioGPS	More reference expression data
Gene ontology
Molecular function	protein phosphatase inhibitor activity; protein serine/threonine phosphatase inhibitor activity
Cellular component	cytoplasm; membrane
Biological process	regulation of phosphorylation; negative regulation of phosphoprotein phosphatase activity
Sources:Amigo / QuickGO
Orthologs
Databases	NCBI: entry; OMA: entry
Species	Human	Mouse
Entrez	81706	76142
Ensembl	ENSG00000198729	ENSMUSG00000040653
UniProt	Q8TAE6	Q8R4S0
RefSeq (mRNA)	NM_030949	NM_133485
RefSeq (protein)	NP_112211	NP_597844
Location (UCSC)	Chr 6: 150.14 – 150.25 Mb	Chr 10: 3.32 – 3.41 Mb
PubMed search
- Wikidata
View/Edit Human	View/Edit Mouse

Protein phosphatase 1 regulatory subunit 14C is an enzyme that in humans is encoded by the PPP1R14C gene.
