= PPP1R8 =

Enzyme found in humans

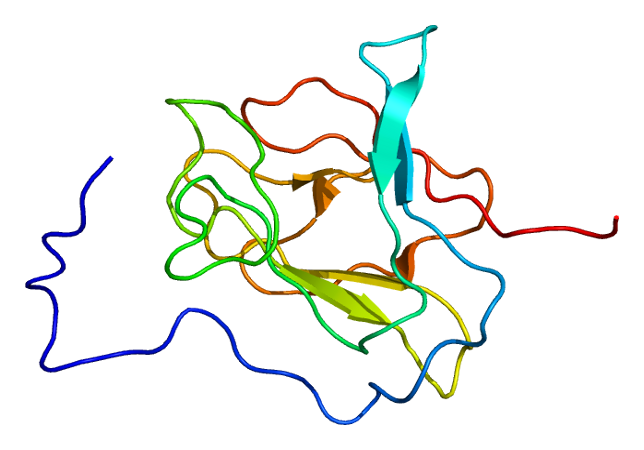

Identifiers
- Aliases: PPP1R8, ARD-1, ARD1, NIPP-1, NIPP1, PRO2047, protein phosphatase 1 regulatory subunit 8
- External IDs: OMIM: 602636; MGI: 2140494; GeneCards: PPP1R8
Available structures
PDB	Ortholog search: PDBe RCSB
PDB	List of PDB id codes 3V4Y

Gene location (Human)
Chr.	Chromosome 1 (human)
Band	1p35.3	Start	27,830,782 bp
Band	1p35.3	End	27,851,676 bp

Gene location (Mouse)
Chr.	Chromosome 4 (mouse)
Band	4|4 D2.3	Start	132,554,240 bp
Band	4|4 D2.3	End	132,570,480 bp
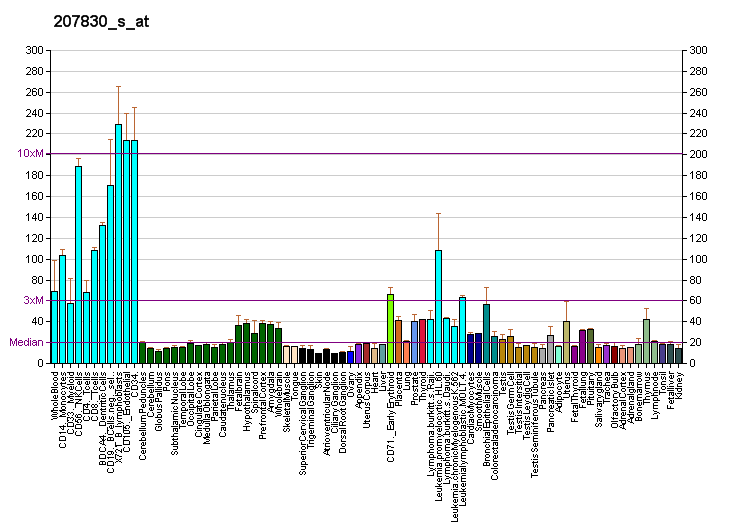
RNA expression pattern
Bgee	Human / Mouse (ortholog); Top expressed in: Achilles tendon; ventricular zone; islet of Langerhans; ganglionic eminence; stromal cell of endometrium; smooth muscle tissue; lymph node; C1 segment; granulocyte; mucosa of sigmoid colon / Top expressed in: somite; mandibular prominence; maxillary prominence; epiblast; medial ganglionic eminence; abdominal wall; hand; otic vesicle; condyle; human fetus; More reference expression data
BioGPS	More reference expression data
Gene ontology
Molecular function	protein serine/threonine phosphatase inhibitor activity; DNA binding; protein binding; RNA binding; protein phosphatase inhibitor activity; nuclease activity; endonuclease activity; ribonuclease E activity; hydrolase activity; mRNA binding; protein phosphatase regulator activity
Cellular component	cytoplasm; nuclear speck; nucleoplasm; spliceosomal complex; nucleus
Biological process	regulation of transcription, DNA-templated; nucleic acid phosphodiester bond hydrolysis; mRNA processing; RNA catabolic process; transcription, DNA-templated; RNA splicing; cell population proliferation; RNA phosphodiester bond hydrolysis; negative regulation of protein dephosphorylation; negative regulation of phosphoprotein phosphatase activity; regulation of phosphoprotein phosphatase activity; production of miRNAs involved in gene silencing by miRNA
Sources:Amigo / QuickGO
Orthologs
Databases	NCBI: entry; OMA: entry
Species	Human	Mouse
Entrez	5511	100336
Ensembl	ENSG00000117751	ENSMUSG00000028882
UniProt	Q12972	Q8R3G1
RefSeq (mRNA)	NM_138558; NM_002713; NM_014110	NM_001290725; NM_146154; NM_001355198; NM_001355199
RefSeq (protein)	NP_002704; NP_054829; NP_612568	NP_001277654; NP_666266; NP_001342127; NP_001342128
Location (UCSC)	Chr 1: 27.83 – 27.85 Mb	Chr 4: 132.55 – 132.57 Mb
PubMed search
- Wikidata
View/Edit Human	View/Edit Mouse

Nuclear inhibitor of protein phosphatase 1 is an enzyme that in humans is encoded by the PPP1R8 gene.

This gene, through alternative splicing, encodes three different isoforms. Two of the protein isoforms encoded by this gene are specific inhibitors of type 1 serine/threonine protein phosphatases and can bind but not cleave RNA. The third protein isoform lacks the phosphatase inhibitory function but is a single-strand endoribonuclease comparable to RNase E of E. coli. This isoform requires magnesium for its function and cleaves specific sites in A+U-rich regions of RNA.

== Interactions ==
PPP1R8 has been shown to interact with PPP1CA, Histone deacetylase 2, SF3B1 EED and the EZH2 domain of PRC2.
