= Nucleosome remodeling factor =

Nucleosome Remodeling Factor (NURF) is an ATP-dependent chromatin remodeling complex first discovered in Drosophila melanogaster (fruit fly) that catalyzes nucleosome sliding in order to regulate gene transcription. It contains an ISWI ATPase, making it part of the ISWI family of chromatin remodeling complexes. NURF is highly conserved among eukaryotes and is involved in transcriptional regulation of developmental genes.

== Discovery ==
NURF was first purified from the model organism Drosophila melanogaster by Toshio Tsukiyama and Carl Wu in 1995. Tsukiyama and Wu described NURF’s chromatin remodeling activity on the hsp70 promoter. It was later discovered that NURF regulates transcription in this manner for hundreds of genes. A human ortholog of NURF, called hNURF, was isolated in 2003.

== Structure ==
The NURF complex in Drosophila contains four subunits: NURF301, NURF140, NURF55, and NURF38. NURF140 is an ISWI ATPase, distinguishable by its HAND, SANT, and SLIDE domains (SANT-like but with several insertions). The NURF complex in Homo sapiens has three subunits, BPTF, SNF2L, and pRBAP46/48, homologous to NURF301, NURF140, and NURF55, respectively. There is no human homolog for NURF38.

== Function ==
NURF interacts with chromatin by binding to modified histones or interacting with various transcription factors. NURF catalyzes nucleosome sliding in either direction on DNA without any apparent modifications to the histone octamer itself. NURF is essential for the expression of homeotic genes. The ISWI ATPase specifically recognizes intact N-terminal histone tails. In Drosophila, NURF interacts with the transcription factor GAGA to remodel chromatin at the hsp70 promoter, and null mutations in the Nurf301 subunit prevent larval metamorphosis. Other NURF mutants cause the development of melanotic tumors from larval blood cells. In humans, hNURF is involved in neuronal development and has been shown to enhance neurite outgrowth in vitro.
