= Chromodomain helicase DNA-binding (CHD) subfamily =

Chromodomain helicase DNA-binding (CHD) proteins is a subfamily of ATP-dependent chromatin remodeling complexes (remodelers). All remodelers fall under the umbrella of RNA/DNA helicase superfamily 2. In yeast, CHD complexes are primarily responsible for nucleosome assembly and organization. These complexes play an additional role in multicellular eukaryotes, assisting in chromatin access and nucleosome editing.

== Functions of CHD subfamily proteins ==
Similar to the imitation switch (ISWI) subfamily of ATP-dependent chromatin remodelers, CHD complexes regulate the assembly and organization of mature nucleosomes along the DNA. Histones are removed during DNA replication; following behind the replisome, histones start to assemble as immature pre-nucleosomes on nascent DNA. With the help of CHD complexes, histone octamers can mature into native nucleosomes. Following nucleosome formation, CHD complexes organize nucleosomes by regularly spacing them apart along the DNA.

Additionally, CHDs in higher-order organisms can slide/eject nucleosomes or histone dimers to allosterically regulate DNA accessibility. Specific CHD complexes, such as the nucleosome remodeling deacetylase (NuRD) complex in C. elegans, can expose binding sites for transcriptional repressors along the chromatin by interacting with highly-modular histone tails; deacetylation of the histone residue H3K9ac is an example of how the NuRD complex can downregulate gene expression and affect DNA topology.

The final mechanism of this subfamily of ATP-dependent remodelers is nucleosome editing. Drosophila dCHD1 can edit nucleosomes by swapping out histone H3 for the variant H3.3. Binding of dCHD1 near the nucleosome causes tension in the DNA. To relieve this tension, an upstream H3 dimer is displaced from the nucleosome, allowing for its replacement by histone variant H3.3. The addition of H3.3 into the nucleosomes is an epigenetic way to keep the chromatin in an accessible, transcription-ready, state. Incorporation of alternative histones and post-translational modifications (PTMs) play an integral role in regulating the cell's histone code.

== Structure of CHD subfamily proteins ==
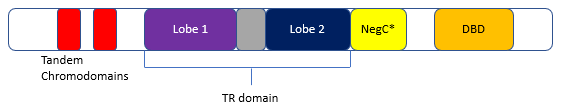
Figure 01: Functional domains of the CHD subfamily of ATP-dependent chromatin remodelers

The unique N-terminal domain of the CDH subfamily contains two chromodomains. The two lobe domains act in tandem as the translocase domain (Tr) and are connected by a peptide linker (Fig. 01). NegC* (similar to NegC in ISWI) acts as an inhibitor to lobe movement and translocation until proper binding of the DNA-binding domain (DBD) occurs. NegC* acts by blocking ATP hydrolysis at the lobes. The DBD also acts as a nucleotide ruler, evenly spacing nucleosomes from one another. Post-DNA binding, the DBD causes tension on the DNA strand resulting in a conformational change that blocks regular NegC* inhibition. This allows for the activation of the TR domain, resulting in DNA translocation.

== Shared mechanism of DNA-translocation between ATP-dependent chromatin remodeling complexes ==
The Tr mechanism of DNA translocation is conserved by all ATP-dependent chromatin remodelers; two RecA-like lobes are mechanistically responsible for translocating the DNA. After binding two helical turns away from a nucleosome, the complex causes the shifting of the aforementioned nucleosome upstream one-two base pairs. In this ATP-driven mechanism, energy from hydrolysis causes the lobes to 'crawl' along the DNA towards the nucleosome dyad until the nucleosomes are correctly assembled, accessed or edited.

== See also ==
Proteins in the family:

- CHD1
- CHD2
- CHD3
- CHD5
- CHD7
