= INO80 Subfamily =

The INO80 subfamily of chromatin remodeling complexes are ATPases, and includes the INO80 and SWR1 complexes.

== Function ==
One of the main roles of the INO80 subfamily is the incorporation and removal of alternate histones in the nucleosome. In the presence of the H2A.Z histone, the INO80 subfamily of remodelers catalyze the repositioning and eventual removal of this alternate histone. The H2A.Z histone is found on the first nucleosome at the beginning of genes. The INO80 subfamily of remodelers will also be recruited to the H2A.X histone in the homologous recombination repair pathway.

In addition to this function, the INO80 subfamily plays a role in transcriptional regulation and genomic recombination. In the DNA damage pathways, the INO80 subfamily aids in repair, recombination, and cell cycle regulation. The INO80 subfamily can activate the recruitment of replication checkpoint factors and can aid in the recovery from replicative stress on the DNA strand. The subfamily's ability to incorporate alternate histones is important for genome stability, disease pathogenesis, and stem cell identity. INO80 complexes commonly bind to nucleosome free regions at transcription start sites and termination sites. INO80 is the only remodeler that is able to use the energy from ATP hydrolysis to create nucleosome free regions and cooperate with other remodelers to equally space nucleosomes.

== Structure ==
Chromatin remodelers in the INO80 subfamily are made of multiple subunit complexes with split ATPase domains. The INO80 subfamily's protein domains are an N-terminus, two RuvB-like proteins (Rvb1 and Rvb2), and a C-terminus. The ATPase domain of the N-terminus functions in the identification of DNA damage and aids in the stability of telomeres. A long insertion in the ATPase domain is what recruits the Rvb1 and Rvb2 helicases. These helicases contribute to genome maintenance and are unique to the INO80 subfamily of chromatin remodeling complexes. This subfamily also contains an Arp4-actin complex that aids in stability of genes. The Arp5 subunit is required for ATPase function, binding to the DNA, and relocation of nucleosomes.
