= CHD2 =

Protein-coding gene in humans

Identifiers
- Aliases: CHD2, EEOC, chromodomain helicase DNA binding protein 2, DEE94
- External IDs: OMIM: 602119; MGI: 2448567; GeneCards: CHD2

Gene location (Human)
| Chr. | Chromosome 15 (human) |
| Band | 15q26.1 | Start | 92,900,189 bp |
| Band | 15q26.1 | End | 93,027,996 bp |

Gene location (Mouse)
| Chr. | Chromosome 7 (mouse) |
| Band | 7|7 D1 | Start | 73,076,386 bp |
| Band | 7|7 D1 | End | 73,191,578 bp |
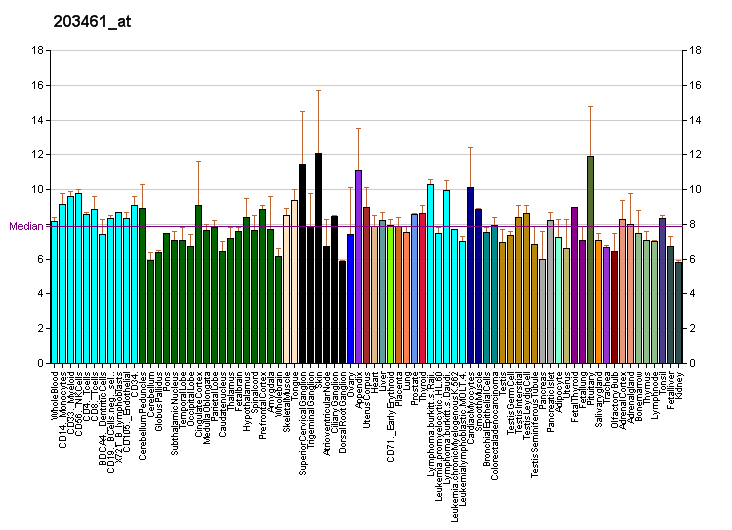
RNA expression pattern
| Bgee | Human / Mouse (ortholog); Top expressed in: Achilles tendon; sural nerve; epithelium of colon; ventricular zone; ganglionic eminence; gastric mucosa; cerebellar hemisphere; right uterine tube; left ovary; left lobe of thyroid gland / Top expressed in: otic vesicle; otolith organ; utricle; genital tubercle; Rostral migratory stream; hand; tail of embryo; mesenteric lymph nodes; ventricular zone; neural layer of retina; More reference expression data |
| BioGPS | More reference expression data |
Gene ontology
| Molecular function | DNA binding; nucleotide binding; helicase activity; DNA helicase activity; histone binding; core promoter sequence-specific DNA binding; protein binding; hydrolase activity; ATP binding; RNA binding; RNA polymerase II cis-regulatory region sequence-specific DNA binding |
| Cellular component | intracellular membrane-bounded organelle; nucleoplasm; nucleolus; extracellular exosome; nucleus |
| Biological process | regulation of transcription, DNA-templated; regulation of transcription by RNA polymerase II; muscle organ development; transcription, DNA-templated; cellular response to DNA damage stimulus; hematopoietic stem cell differentiation; DNA duplex unwinding; chromatin organization |
Sources:Amigo / QuickGO
Orthologs
| Databases | NCBI: entry; OMA: entry |
| Species | Human | Mouse |
| Entrez | 1106 | 244059 |
| Ensembl | ENSG00000173575 | ENSMUSG00000078671 |
| UniProt | O14647 | E9PZM4 |
| RefSeq (mRNA) | NM_001271; NM_001042572 | NM_001081345 |
| RefSeq (protein) | NP_001036037; NP_001262 | NP_001074814 |
| Location (UCSC) | Chr 15: 92.9 – 93.03 Mb | Chr 7: 73.08 – 73.19 Mb |
| PubMed search |
- Wikidata
| View/Edit Human | View/Edit Mouse |

Chromodomain-helicase-DNA-binding protein 2 is an enzyme that in humans is encoded by the CHD2 gene.

== Function ==
The CHD family of proteins is characterized by the presence of chromo (chromatin organization modifier) domains and SNF2-related helicase/ATPase domains. CHD genes alter gene expression possibly by modification of chromatin structure thus altering access of the transcriptional apparatus to its chromosomal DNA template. CHD2 catalyzes the assembly of chromatin into periodic arrays; and the N-terminal region of CHD2, which contains tandem chromodomains, serves an auto-inhibitory role in both the DNA-binding and ATPase activities of CHD2. Alternatively spliced transcript variants encoding distinct isoforms have been found for this gene.

== Clinical significance ==
De novo mutations and deletions in this gene have been associated with cases of epileptic encephalopathies.

CHD2 epilepsy is increasingly being identified as a subpopulation of Lennox-Gastaut Syndrome.

CHD2 myoclonic encephalopathy is a condition characterized by recurrent seizures (epilepsy), abnormal brain function (encephalopathy), and intellectual disability. Epilepsy begins in childhood, typically between ages 6 months and 4 years. Each individual may experience a variety of seizure types, most commonly myoclonic seizures.

Recently, de novo mutations or deletions in CHD2 has been linked to intellectual disability and to autism. Researchers found 27 genes which abolish function of the corresponding protein — in at least two people with autism, and 6 genes are mutated in three or more people with autism. These six genes — CHD8, DYRK1A, ANK2, GRIN2B, DSCAM and CHD2 — are the strongest autism candidates identified so far.

== Family support ==
Syndromes associated with mutations or deletions in CHD2 can be devastating. Families of individuals with CHD2 mutations or deletions can join the CHD2 Support and Research Group on Facebook or find information and support through the non-profit organization Coalition to Cure CHD2.
