= Imitation SWI =

Proteine

ISWI (Imitation SWItch) is one of the five major DNA chromatin remodeling complex types, or subfamilies, found in most eukaryotic organisms. ISWI remodeling complexes place nucleosomes along segments of DNA at regular intervals. The placement of nucleosomes by ISWI protein complexes typically results in the silencing of the DNA because the nucleosome placement prevents transcription of the DNA. ISWI, like the closely related SWI/SNF subfamily, is an ATP-dependent chromatin remodeler. However, the chromatin remodeling activities of ISWI and SWI/SNF are distinct and mediate the binding of non-overlapping sets of DNA transcription factors.

The protein ISW1 is the first ATPase subunit which has been isolated in the ISWI chromatin remodeling family in the fruit fly Drosophila. This protein presents high level of similarity to the SWI/SNF chromatin remodeling family in the ATPase domain. Outside the ATPase domain ISWI loses the similarity with the member of the SWI/SNF family, possessing a SANT domain instead of the bromodomain. The protein ISWI can interact with several proteins giving three different chromatin-remodeling complexes in Drosophila melanogaster: NURF (nucleosome remodeling factor), CHRAC (chromatin remodeling and assembly complex) and ACF (ATP-utilising chromatin remodeling and assembly factor).

In vitro, the ISWI protein alone can assemble nucleosomes on linear DNA and it can move nucleosomes on linear DNA from the center to the extremities. Inside the CHRAC complex, ISWI catalyzes the inverse reaction, moving nucleosomes from the extremities to the center.

== Generation of loops in dsDNA ==
A single molecule study using atomic force microscopy (AFM) and tethered particle motion (TPM) has observed that ISWI can bind naked DNA in the absence of ATP, wrapping DNA around the protein. In presence of ATP, the protein generates DNA loops while simultaneously generating negative supercoils in the template. The first figure in this paper shows three AFM images from where single DNA interacting with ISWI was deposed on mica surfaces. On the center, a single ISWI is bound near the end of a dsDNA template. The right image shows two DNA loops generated by ISWI. These loops contains supercoils. The TPM study instead showed that the duration of loop formed by ISWI was ATP-dependent.
