= ARB2A =

Protein-coding gene in humans

Identifiers
- Aliases: ARB2A, C5orf21, family with sequence similarity 172 member A, Toupee, FAM172A, ARB2 cotranscriptional regulator A
- External IDs: MGI: 1915925; GeneCards: ARB2A

Gene location (Human)
Chr.	Chromosome 5 (human)
Band	5q15	Start	93,617,725 bp
Band	5q15	End	94,111,699 bp

Gene location (Mouse)
Chr.	Chromosome 13 (mouse)
Band	13|13 C1	Start	77,850,152 bp
Band	13|13 C1	End	78,314,354 bp
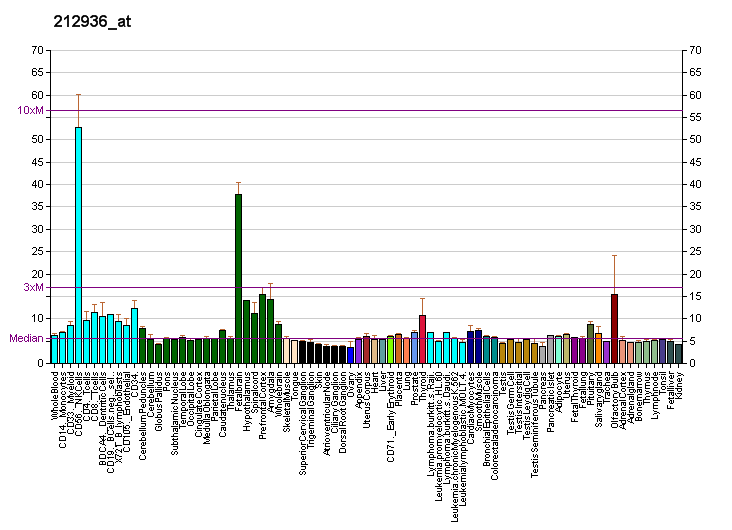

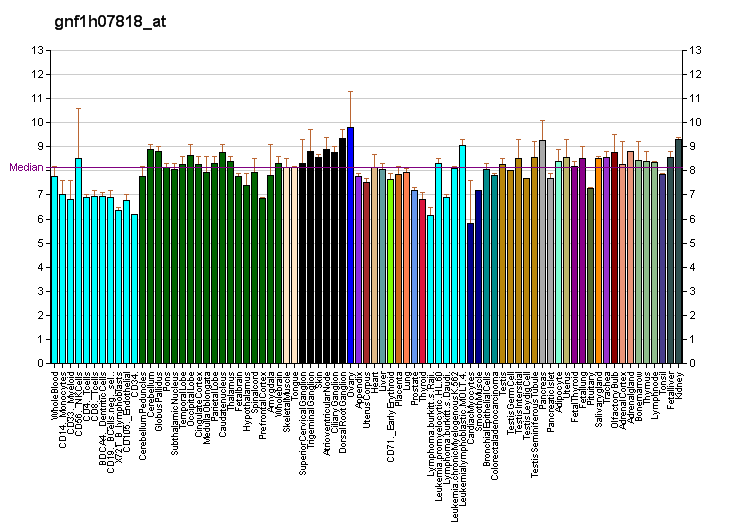

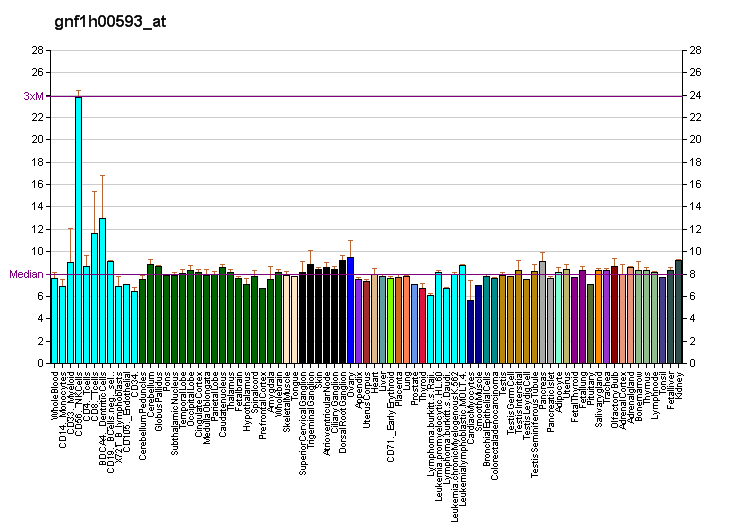
RNA expression pattern
Bgee	Human / Mouse (ortholog); Top expressed in: Achilles tendon; tendon of biceps brachii; caput epididymis; optic nerve; epithelium of colon; corpus epididymis; paraflocculus of cerebellum; tail of epididymis; bronchial epithelial cell; stromal cell of endometrium / Top expressed in: spermatocyte; zygote; medial ganglionic eminence; Region I of hippocampus proper; superior cervical ganglion; ventricular zone; secondary oocyte; genital tubercle; thymus; hand; More reference expression data
BioGPS	More reference expression data
Gene ontology
Molecular function	siRNA binding
Cellular component	endoplasmic reticulum; extracellular region; nucleus; cytoplasm
Biological process	regulation of alternative mRNA splicing, via spliceosome; neural crest cell development; mRNA processing; RNA splicing; heterochromatin assembly by small RNA
Sources:Amigo / QuickGO
Orthologs
Databases	NCBI: entry; OMA: entry
Species	Human	Mouse
Entrez	83989	68675
Ensembl	ENSG00000113391	ENSMUSG00000064138
UniProt	Q8WUF8	Q3TNH5
RefSeq (mRNA)	NM_001163417; NM_001163418; NM_032042	NM_001163419; NM_001163420; NM_138312
RefSeq (protein)	NP_001156889; NP_001156890; NP_114431	NP_001156891; NP_001156892; NP_612185
Location (UCSC)	Chr 5: 93.62 – 94.11 Mb	Chr 13: 77.85 – 78.31 Mb
PubMed search
- Wikidata
View/Edit Human	View/Edit Mouse

Cotranscriptional regulator ARB2A is a protein that in humans is encoded by the ARB2A gene (previously FAM172A). ARB2A has been predicted to be involved in regulating alternative RNA splicing through interaction with AGO2 and CHD7. ARB2A has a paralog, ARB2BP, which may be a non-functional pseudogene.
