= SWI/SNF =

Subfamily of ATP-dependent chromatin remodeling complexes

Snf2 ATPase bound to a nucleosome
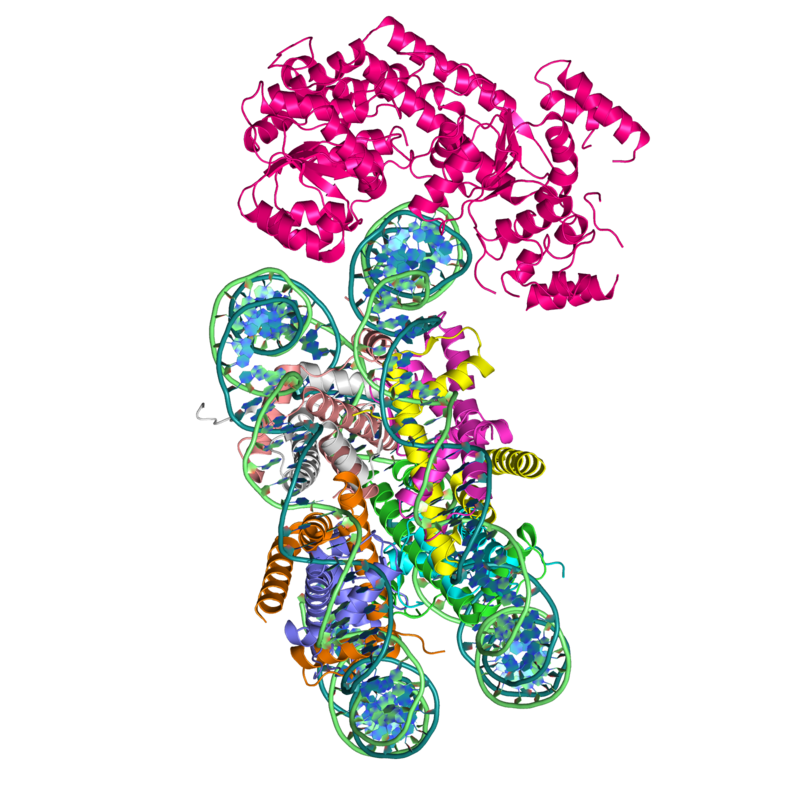
- Cryo-EM reconstruction of S. cerevisiae Snf2 ATPase in complex with a nucleosome

Identifiers
- Symbol: Snf2
- Pfam: PF00176
- InterPro: IPR000330
- SMART: DEXDc
- SCOP2: 5x0x / SCOPe / SUPFAM
Available protein structures:
- PDB: IPR000330 PF00176 (ECOD; PDBsum)
- AlphaFold: IPR000330; PF00176

In molecular biology, SWI/SNF (SWItch/Sucrose Non-Fermentable), is a subfamily of ATP-dependent chromatin remodeling complexes, which is found in eukaryotes. In other words, it is a group of proteins that associate to remodel the way DNA is packaged. This complex is composed of several proteins – products of the SWI and SNF genes (SWI1, SWI2/SNF2, SWI3, SWI5, SWI6), as well as other polypeptides. It possesses a DNA-stimulated ATPase activity that can destabilize histone-DNA interactions in reconstituted nucleosomes in an ATP-dependent manner, though the exact nature of this structural change is unknown. The SWI/SNF subfamily provides crucial nucleosome rearrangement, which is seen as ejection and/or sliding. The movement of nucleosomes provides easier access to the chromatin, enabling binding of specific transcription factors, and allowing genes to be activated or repressed.

The human analogs of SWI/SNF are "BRG1- or BRM-associated factors", or BAF (SWI/SNF-A) and "Polybromo-associated BAF", which is also known as PBAF (SWI/SNF-B). There are also Drosophila analogs of SWI/SNF, known as "Brahma Associated Protein", or BAP and "Polybromo-associated BAP", also known as PBAP.

== Mechanism of action ==
It has been found that the SWI/SNF complex (in yeast) is capable of altering the position of nucleosomes along DNA. These alterations are classified in three different ways, and they are seen as the processes of sliding nucleosomes, ejecting nucleosomes, and ejecting only certain components of the nucleosome. Due to the actions performed by the SWI/SNF subfamily, they are referred to as "access remodellers" and promote gene expression by exposing binding sites so that transcription factors can bind more easily. Two mechanisms for nucleosome remodeling by SWI/SNF have been proposed. The first model contends that a unidirectional diffusion of a twist defect within the nucleosomal DNA results in a corkscrew-like propagation of DNA over the octamer surface that initiates at the DNA entry site of the nucleosome. The other is known as the "bulge" or "loop-recapture" mechanism and it involves the dissociation of DNA at the edge of the nucleosome with re-association of DNA inside the nucleosome, forming a DNA bulge on the octamer surface. The DNA loop would then propagate across the surface of the histone octamer in a wave-like manner, resulting in the re-positioning of DNA without changes in the total number of histone-DNA contacts. A recent study has provided strong evidence against the twist diffusion mechanism and has further strengthened the loop-recapture model.

== Role as a tumor suppressor ==
The mammalian SWI/SNF (mSWI/SNF) complex functions as a tumor suppressor in many human malignant cancers. Early studies identified that SWI/SNF subunits were frequently absent in cancer cell lines. SWI/SNF was first identified in 1998 as a tumor suppressor in rhabdoid tumors, a rare pediatric malignant cancer. Other instances of SWI/SNF acting as a tumor suppressor comes from the heterozygous deletion of BAF47 or alteration of BAF47. These instances result in cases of chronic and acute CML and in rarer cases, Hodgkin's lymphoma, respectively. To prove that BAF47, also known as SMARCB1, acts as a tumor suppressor, experiments resulting in the formation of rhabdoid tumors in mice were conducted via total knockout of BAF47. As DNA sequencing costs diminished, many tumors were sequenced for the first time around 2010. Several of these studies revealed SWI/SNF to be a tumor suppressor in a number of diverse malignancies. Several studies revealed that subunits of the mammalian complex, including ARID1A, PBRM1, SMARCB1, SMARCA4, and ARID2, are frequently mutated in human cancers. It has been noted that total loss of BAF47 is extremely rare and instead, most cases of tumors that resulted from SWI/SNF subunits come from BRG1 deletion, BRM deletion, or total loss of both subunits. Further analysis concluded that total loss of both subunits was present in about 10% of tumor cell lines after 100 cell lines were looked at. A meta-analysis of many sequencing studies demonstrated SWI/SNF to be mutated in approximately 20% of human malignancies.

== Role as a cancer dependency ==
The function of the mammalian SWI/SNF complex is highly tissue-specific, and in addition to its role as a tumor suppressor described above, SWI/SNF complexes also act as dependencies in several different cancer contexts, including acute myeloid leukemia, prostate cancer, neuroblastoma, uveal melanoma, synovial sarcoma, and lung cancer. Because SWI/SNF complexes are viewed as potentially viable drug targets for treating tumors that depend of SWI/SNF activity, several programs in the pharmaceutical industry and in academic settings have sought to develop inhibitors or protein degraders of the complex. Small molecules that inactivate SWI/SNF complexes by interfering with ATP hydrolysis or by causing degradation of key protein subunits have demonstrated efficacy in pre-clinical studies. Common to many of these settings is the requirement of SWI/SNF activity to promote the expression of genes involved in replication commitment, specifically for the expression of proteins that promote transition between G1 and S phase of the cell cycle. This area is rapidly evolving and the development of drugs targeting these complexes is ongoing.

== Structure of the SWI/SNF complex ==
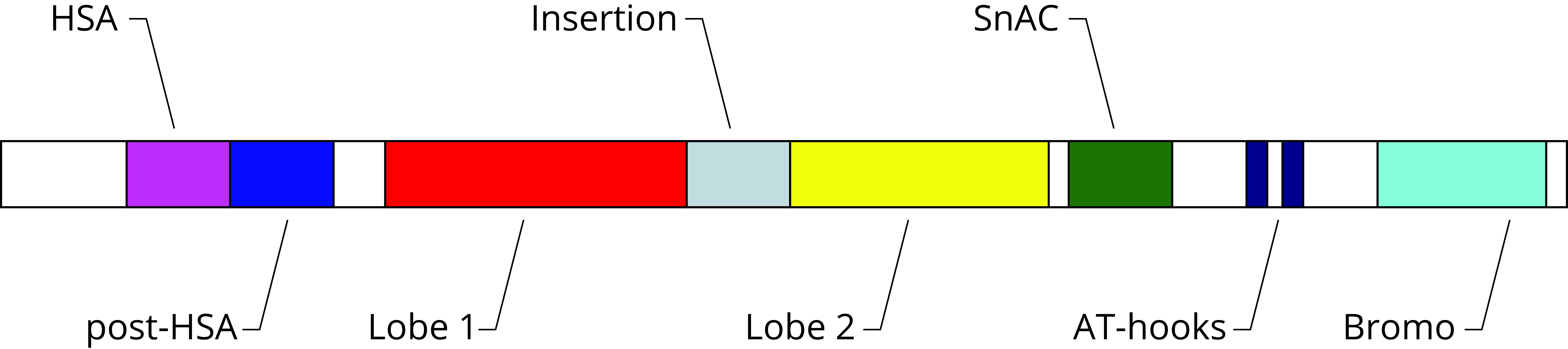
Domain organization of SWI/SNF: a subfamily within the ATP-Dependent chromatin remodeling complexes

Electron microscopy studies of SWI/SNF and RSC (SWI/SNF-B) reveal large, lobed 1.1-1.3 MDa structures. These structures resemble RecA and cover both sides of a conserved section of the ATPase domain. The domain also contains a separate domain, HSA, that is capable of binding actin, and resides on the N-terminus. The bromo domain present is responsible for recognizing and binding lysines that have been acetylated. No atomic-resolution structures of the entire SWI/SNF complex have been obtained to date, due to the protein complex being highly dynamic and composed of many subunits. However, domains and several individual subunits from yeast and mammals have been described. In particular, the cryo-EM structure of the ATPase Snf2 in complex with a nucleosome shows that nucleosomal DNA is locally deformed at the site of binding. A model of the mammalian ATPase SMARCA4 shows similar features, based on the high degree of sequence homology with yeast Snf2. The interface between two subunits, BAF155 (SMARCC1) and BAF47 (SMARCB1) was also resolved, providing important insights into the mechanisms of the SWI/SNF complex assembly pathway.

== SWIB/MDM2 protein domain ==
The protein domain, SWIB/MDM2, short for SWI/SNF complex B/MDM2 is an important domain. This protein domain has been found in both SWI/SNF complex B and in the negative regulator of the p53 tumor suppressor MDM2. It has been shown that MDM2 is homologous to the SWIB complex.

=== Function ===
The primary function of the SWIB protein domain is to aid gene expression. In yeast, this protein domain expresses certain genes, in particular BADH2, GAL1, GAL4, and SUC2. It works by increasing transcription. It has ATPase activity, meaning it breaks down ATP, the basic unit of energy currency. This destabilizes the interaction between DNA and histones. The destabilization that occurs disrupts chromatin and opens up the transcription-binding domains. Transcription factors can then bind to this site, leading to an increase in transcription.

=== Protein interaction ===
The various protein subunits that make up the SWI/SNF complex interact with each other in different configurations to form three distinct types of SWI/SNF complex: canonical BAF (cBAF), polybromo-associated BAF (pBAF) and non-canonical BAF (ncBAF). Specifically, cBAF is currently thought to regulate gene enhancers, while pBAF and ncBAF function at regions proximal to gene promoters. In addition to their many interactions within the family of SWI/SNF related proteins, some subunits such as SNF5 and BAF155 are capable of interacting with transcription factors, such as c-MYC and the FOS and JUN family proteins of the AP-1 complex. In human cells, the interaction of SWI/SNF with multiple transcription factors and co-activators is mediated by binding of the ARID1A subunit with beta-catenin, which in turn binds a diverse set of binding partners.

=== Structure ===
This protein domain is known to contain one short alpha helix.

== Family members ==
Below is a list of yeast SWI/SNF family members with human and Drosophila orthologs:

Yeast	Human	Drosophila	Function
SWI1	ARID1A, ARID1B	OSA	Contains LXXLL nuclear receptor binding motifs
SWI2/SNF2	SMARCA2, SMARCA4	BRM	ATP dependent chromatin remodeling
SWI3	SMARCC1, SMARCC2	Moira/BAP155	Similar sequence; function unknown
SWP73/SNF12	SMARCD1, SMARCD2, SMARCD3	BAP60	Similar sequence; function unknown
SWP61/ARP7	ACTL6A, ACTL6B		Actin-like protein
SNF5	SMARCB1	SNR1	ATP dependent chromatin remodeling

== History ==
The SWI/SNF complex was first discovered in the yeast, Saccharomyces cerevisiae. It was named after initially screening for mutations that would affect the pathways for both yeast mating types switching (SWI) and sucrose non-fermenting (SNF).

== See also ==
- Mammalian SWI/SNF (BAF) complex
- Mdm2
- Chromatin structure remodeling (RSC) complex
- Transcription coregulator
