= ACTL6A =

Protein-coding gene in the species Homo sapiens

Identifiers
- Aliases: ACTL6A, ACTL6, ARPN-BETA, Arp4, BAF53A, INO80K, actin like 6A, SMARCN1
- External IDs: OMIM: 604958; MGI: 1861453; GeneCards: ACTL6A

Gene location (Human)
Chr.	Chromosome 3 (human)
Band	3q26.33	Start	179,562,886 bp
Band	3q26.33	End	179,588,407 bp

Gene location (Mouse)
Chr.	Chromosome 3 (mouse)
Band	3|3 A3	Start	32,760,447 bp
Band	3|3 A3	End	32,781,122 bp
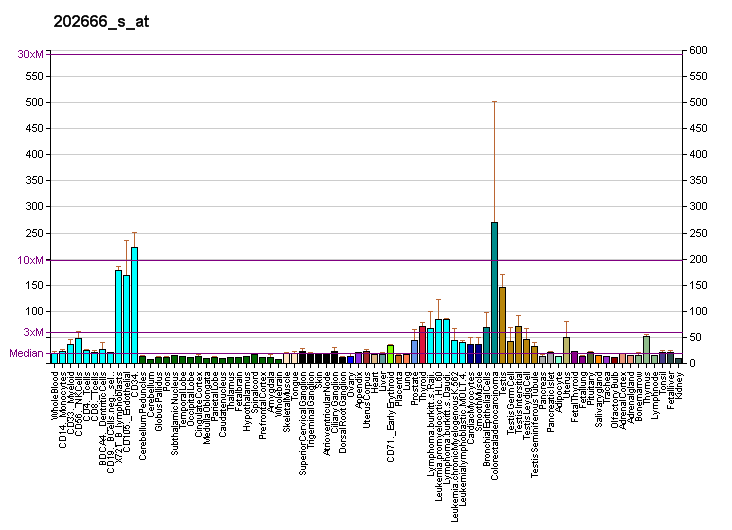
RNA expression pattern
Bgee	Human / Mouse (ortholog); Top expressed in: gonad; Achilles tendon; ganglionic eminence; ventricular zone; oocyte; right testis; left testis; secondary oocyte; rectum; islet of Langerhans / Top expressed in: ectoderm; otic vesicle; internal carotid artery; otic placode; maxillary prominence; mandibular prominence; external carotid artery; abdominal wall; epiblast; medial ganglionic eminence; More reference expression data
BioGPS	More reference expression data
Gene ontology
Molecular function	RNA polymerase II cis-regulatory region sequence-specific DNA binding; transcription coactivator activity; chromatin binding; protein binding; nucleosomal DNA binding
Cellular component	SWI/SNF complex; Ino80 complex; NuA4 histone acetyltransferase complex; plasma membrane; nucleoplasm; npBAF complex; nucleus; protein-containing complex
Biological process	chromatin remodeling; DNA recombination; regulation of transcription, DNA-templated; positive regulation of protein targeting to mitochondrion; regulation of transcription by RNA polymerase II; histone H2A acetylation; transcription, DNA-templated; nervous system development; cellular response to DNA damage stimulus; regulation of autophagy of mitochondrion; spinal cord development; histone H4 acetylation; regulation of growth; DNA repair; neural retina development; signal transduction; protein deubiquitination; blastocyst formation; chromatin organization; positive regulation of nucleic acid-templated transcription
Sources:Amigo / QuickGO
Orthologs
Databases	NCBI: entry; OMA: entry
Species	Human	Mouse
Entrez	86	56456
Ensembl	ENSG00000136518	ENSMUSG00000027671
UniProt	O96019	Q9Z2N8
RefSeq (mRNA)	NM_178042; NM_004301; NM_177989	NM_019673
RefSeq (protein)	NP_004292; NP_817126; NP_829888	NP_062647
Location (UCSC)	Chr 3: 179.56 – 179.59 Mb	Chr 3: 32.76 – 32.78 Mb
PubMed search
- Wikidata
View/Edit Human	View/Edit Mouse

Actin-like protein 6A is a protein that in humans is encoded by the ACTL6A gene.

== Function ==
This gene encodes a family member of actin-related proteins (ARPs), which share significant amino acid sequence identity to conventional actins. Both actins and ARPs have an actin fold, which is an ATP-binding cleft, as a common feature. The ARPs are involved in diverse cellular processes, including vesicular transport, spindle orientation, nuclear migration and chromatin remodeling. This gene encodes a 53 kDa subunit protein of the BAF (BRG1/brm-associated factor) complex in mammals, which is functionally related to SWI/SNF complex in S. cerevisiae and Drosophila; the latter is thought to facilitate transcriptional activation of specific genes by antagonizing chromatin-mediated transcriptional repression. Together with beta-actin, it is required for maximal ATPase activity of BRG1, and for the association of the BAF complex with chromatin/matrix. Three transcript variants that encode two different protein isoforms have been described.

== Clinical significance ==
ACTL6A is amplified in head and squamous cancers and confers poor prognosis in patients. This is also the first report of amplification of an epigenetic factor by Saladi SV. In hepatocellular carcinomas, it promotes metastasis.

== Interactions ==
ACTL6A has been shown to interact with SMARCA2, Myc, Transformation/transcription domain-associated protein, RuvB-like 1 and SMARCA4.
