= BESS domain =

BESS

Identifiers
- Symbol: BESS
- Pfam: PF02944
- InterPro: IPR004210
Available protein structures:
- Pfam: structures / ECOD
- PDB: RCSB PDB; PDBe; PDBj
- PDBsum: structure summary

In molecular biology, the BESS domain is a protein domain which has been named after the three proteins that originally defined the domain: BEAF (Boundary element associated factor 32), Suvar(3)7 and Stonewall). The BESS domain is 40 amino acid residues long and is predicted to be composed of three alpha helices, as such it might be related to the myb/SANT HTH domain. The BESS domain directs a variety of protein-protein interactions, including interactions with itself, with Dorsal, and with a TBP-associated factor. It is found in a single copy in Drosophila proteins and is often associated with the MADF domain.

Proteins known to contain a BESS domain include:

- Drosophila Boundary element associated factor 32 (BEAF-32).
- Drosophila Suppressor of variegation protein 3-7 (Su(var)3-7), which could play a role in chromosome condensation.
- Drosophila Ravus, which is homologous to the C-terminal part of Su(var)3-7.
- Drosophila Stonewall (Stwl), a putative transcription factor required for maintenance of female germline stem cells as well as oocyte differentiation.
- Drosophila Adf-1, a transcription factor first identified on the basis of its interaction with the alcohol dehydrogenase promoter but that binds the promoters of a diverse group of genes.
- Drosophila Dorsal-interacting protein 3 (Dip3). It functions both as an activator to bind DNA in a sequence specific manner and a coactivator to stimulate synergistic activation by Dorsal and Twist.
