= CHD5 =

Protein-coding gene in humans

Identifiers
- Aliases: CHD5, CHD-5, chromodomain helicase DNA binding protein 5, PMNDS
- External IDs: OMIM: 610771; MGI: 3036258; GeneCards: CHD5

Gene location (Human)
Chr.	Chromosome 1 (human)
Band	1p36.31	Start	6,101,787 bp
Band	1p36.31	End	6,180,321 bp

Gene location (Mouse)
Chr.	Chromosome 4 (mouse)
Band	4|4 E2	Start	152,423,108 bp
Band	4|4 E2	End	152,474,651 bp
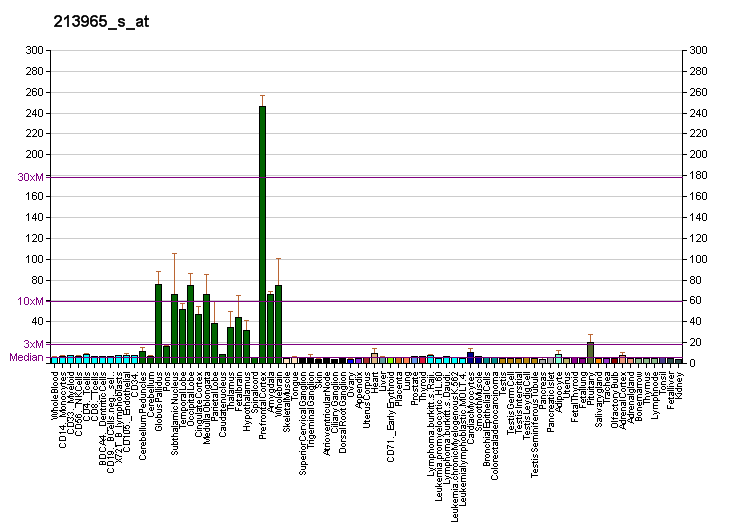

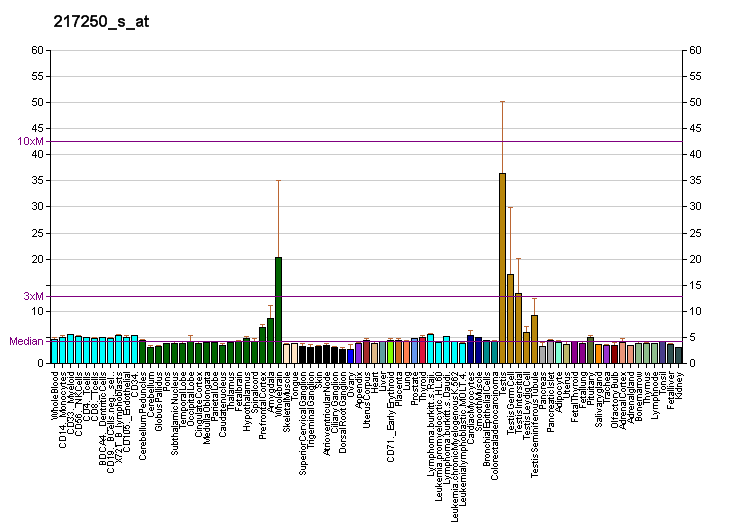
RNA expression pattern
Bgee	Human / Mouse (ortholog); Top expressed in: sperm; right frontal lobe; cingulate gyrus; anterior cingulate cortex; Brodmann area 10; Brodmann area 9; pituitary gland; left testis; right testis; primary visual cortex / Top expressed in: subiculum; central gray substance of midbrain; dorsal tegmental nucleus; cingulate gyrus; visual cortex; habenula; lateral hypothalamus; primary visual cortex; medial vestibular nucleus; paraventricular nucleus of hypothalamus; More reference expression data
BioGPS	More reference expression data
Gene ontology
Molecular function	DNA binding; nucleotide binding; helicase activity; metal ion binding; H3K27me3 modified histone binding; hydrolase activity; ATP binding
Cellular component	NuRD complex; membrane; heterochromatin; nucleus; nucleoplasm; cytosol; nuclear speck
Biological process	cell differentiation; regulation of transcription, DNA-templated; histone H3-K27 trimethylation; positive regulation of signal transduction by p53 class mediator; transcription, DNA-templated; nervous system development; spermatogenesis; histone H4 acetylation; cerebral cortex neuron differentiation; negative regulation of cell population proliferation; chromatin organization
Sources:Amigo / QuickGO
Orthologs
Databases	NCBI: entry; OMA: entry
Species	Human	Mouse
Entrez	26038	269610
Ensembl	ENSG00000116254	ENSMUSG00000005045
UniProt	Q8TDI0	A2A8L1
RefSeq (mRNA)	NM_015557	NM_001081376; NM_029216; NM_001369243
RefSeq (protein)	NP_056372	NP_001074845; NP_083492; NP_001356172
Location (UCSC)	Chr 1: 6.1 – 6.18 Mb	Chr 4: 152.42 – 152.47 Mb
PubMed search
- Wikidata
View/Edit Human	View/Edit Mouse

Chromodomain-helicase-DNA-binding protein 5 is an enzyme that in humans is encoded by the CHD5 gene. It is a part of the CHD subfamily of ATP-dependent chromatin remodeling complexes.
