= SMARCD2 =

Protein-coding gene in the species Homo sapiens

Identifiers
- Aliases: SMARCD2, BAF60B, CRACD2, Rsc6p, PRO2451, SWI/SNF related, matrix associated, actin dependent regulator of chromatin, subfamily d, member 2, SGD2
- External IDs: OMIM: 601736; MGI: 1933621; GeneCards: SMARCD2

Gene location (Human)
Chr.	Chromosome 17 (human)
Band	17q23.3	Start	63,832,081 bp
Band	17q23.3	End	63,843,065 bp

Gene location (Mouse)
Chr.	Chromosome 11 (mouse)
Band	11|11 E1	Start	106,154,005 bp
Band	11|11 E1	End	106,163,798 bp
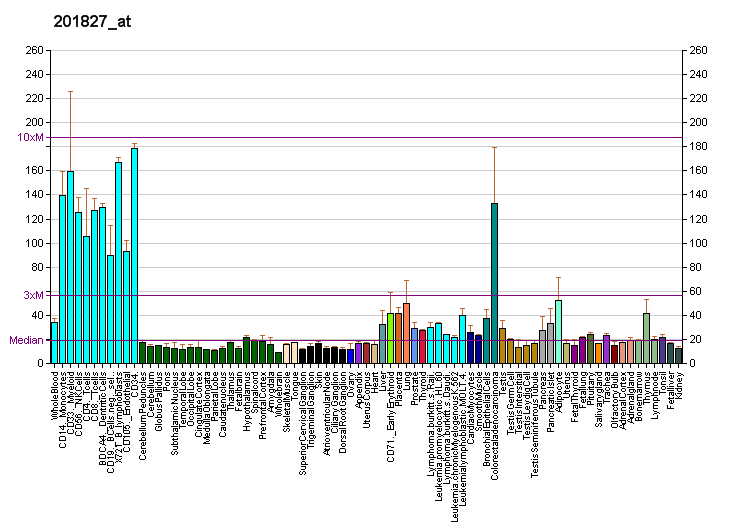
RNA expression pattern
Bgee	Human / Mouse (ortholog); Top expressed in: skin of abdomen; skin of leg; body of pancreas; gastric mucosa; body of stomach; minor salivary glands; left uterine tube; ectocervix; cerebellar hemisphere; tibial nerve / Top expressed in: Ileal epithelium; conjunctival fornix; renal corpuscle; medullary collecting duct; hair follicle; Paneth cell; lacrimal gland; condyle; fossa; internal carotid artery; More reference expression data
BioGPS	More reference expression data
Gene ontology
Molecular function	RNA polymerase II cis-regulatory region sequence-specific DNA binding; nucleosomal DNA binding; transcription coactivator activity; protein binding
Cellular component	SWI/SNF complex; nucleus; nucleoplasm; protein-containing complex
Biological process	regulation of transcription by RNA polymerase II; chromatin remodeling; nucleosome disassembly; regulation of transcription, DNA-templated; transcription, DNA-templated; chromatin organization; positive regulation of nucleic acid-templated transcription
Sources:Amigo / QuickGO
Orthologs
Databases	NCBI: entry; OMA: entry
Species	Human	Mouse
Entrez	6603	83796
Ensembl	ENSG00000108604	ENSMUSG00000078619
UniProt	Q92925	Q99JR8
RefSeq (mRNA)	NM_001098426; NM_003077; NM_001330439; NM_001330440	NM_001130187; NM_031878
RefSeq (protein)	NP_001091896; NP_001317368; NP_001317369	NP_001123659; NP_114084
Location (UCSC)	Chr 17: 63.83 – 63.84 Mb	Chr 11: 106.15 – 106.16 Mb
PubMed search
- Wikidata
View/Edit Human	View/Edit Mouse

SWI/SNF-related matrix-associated actin-dependent regulator of chromatin subfamily D member 2 is a protein in humans that is encoded by the SMARCD2 gene.

The protein encoded by this gene is a member of the SWI/SNF family of proteins, whose members display helicase and ATPase activities and which are thought to regulate transcription of certain genes by altering the chromatin structure around those genes. The encoded protein is part of the large ATP-dependent chromatin remodeling complex SNF/SWI and has sequence similarity to the yeast Swp73 protein.
