= Mammalian SWI/SNF (BAF) complex =

Chromatin remodeling complex

The SWI/SNF complex, known as the BAF (BRG1/BRM-associated factor) complex in mammals is a chromatin remodeling complex with multiple subunits that regulate gene expression by altering chromatin accessibility and DNA access for transcription factors. BAF complex remodels nucleosomes through ATP hydrolysis mediated by its catalytic subunits BRG1 (SMARCA4) or BRM (SMARCA2).

The BAF complex exists in subtypes, canonical BAF (cBAF), BAFE (PBAF), and non-canonical BAF (ncBAF), each defined by unique subunit compositions that lead them to have specific biological functions. Mutations, including the loss of function mutations, in specific subunits have been a driving factor in various human diseases, most notably cancer, making BAF complexes integral in current molecular biology and research pertaining to biomedicine.

About 20% of patients with different forms of cancer had mutations in at least one BAF complex member. In particular, these include breast cancers related to mutations in ARID1A/B, PBRM1, and ARID2, endometriosis-associated ovarian cancers caused by mutations in ARID1A, and renal medullary carcinomas characterized by loss of SMARCB1. Additionally, both diffuse large B-cell lymphoma (DLBCL) and Burkitt lymphoma are subtypes of non-Hodgkin lymphoma originating from germinal center B cells; while DLBCL is the most common, Burkitt lymphoma is the most aggressive and clinically significant. Burkitt lymphoma, in particular, is frequently linked to mutations in ARID1A and SMARCA4.

== Structure and subunits ==
The BAF complex is composed of three main modules. Among these, the ATPase motor module is the driving force behind chromatin remodeling. This module uses the energy obtained from ATP hydrolysis to move nucleosomes along the DNA. The core module, including ARID1A and SMARCC subunits, structures the complex and facilitates interactions with the other modules. The Actin-Related Protein module, which connects these two modules, enhances the structural integrity of the complex and ensures proper transmission of mechanical forces within it. Different combinations of the subunits that make up these modules determine the functional diversity of the complex, leading to the formation of subcomplexes such as cBAF, PBAF, and ncBAF (Table 1). Therefore, the structure of the BAF complex enables cell-specific genetic responses through specific dynamic interactions between modules and variability in subunit composition.

- cBAF: The cBAF complex, which is the most common among the others, plays a role in the initiation of gene expression. It functions primarily at enhancer regions, controlling developmental processes and playing a critical role in cell differentiation.
- PBAF: PBAF contributes to the maintenance of gene transcription. It is typically localized at active promoter regions and also functions as a tumor suppressor in certain contexts.
- ncBAF: Although it also acts at enhancer regions like cBAF, unlike the other two complex types, ncBAF has a distinct structure. It is known to regulate cell type-specific gene expression. Moreover, the unique composition of the ncBAF complex (i.e. Bromodomain-containing protein 9 -BRD9- subunit) makes it an attractive target for drug development efforts.

The three forms of the BAF complex (Figure 1) have different combinations of parts that show how each one works in a specific way. For example, the ncBAF includes SS18, GLTSCR1/1L, and BRD9; cBAF has ARID1A/B, DPF1/2/3, and SS18. SS18 is shared among these two complexes but not with PBAF. On the other hand, PBAF includes PHF10, ARID2, BRD7, and PBRM1, which are unique to it. Meanwhile, ACTL6, β-actin, BCL7A/B/C, SMARCA2/4, SMARCD1/2/3, SMARCB1, SMARCE1, and SMARCC1/2 are shared across all three complex types (Table 1).

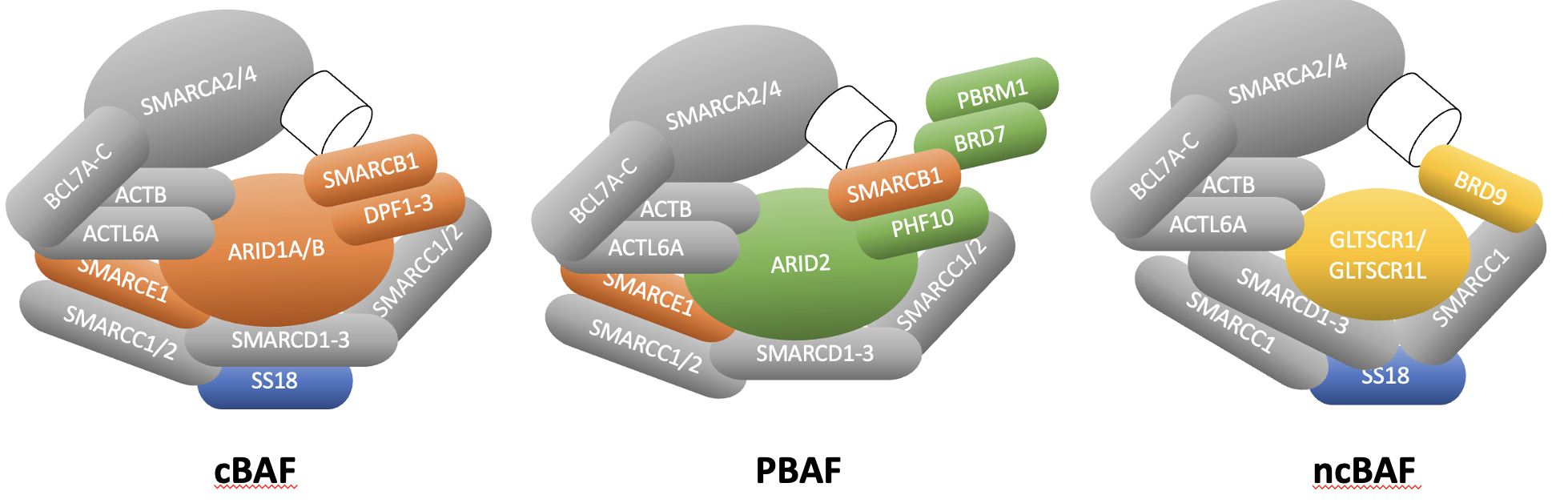
Figure 1: Three forms of mammalian SWI/SNF (BAF) complex.

Table 1. Subunit compositions of mammalian BAF complexes

Subunit Type	ncBAF	cBAF	PBAF
Shared	ACTL6, β-actin, BCL7A/B/C, SMARCA2/4, SMARCD1/2/3, SMARCB1, SMARCE1, SMARCC1/2		
Specific	BRD9, GLTSCR1/1L, SS18	ARID1A/B, DPF1/2/3, SS18	PHF10, ARID2, BRD7, PBRM1

== Biochemical mechanisms of BAF complex remodeling ==
Many remodeling enzymes utilize the energy derived from ATP hydrolysis to shift DNA along nucleosomes through its ATP-dependent DNA translocase activity. In BAF complexes, BGR1 and BRM are the catalytic subunits. After BRG1/BRM binds to the nucleosome through mechanisms such as twist diffusion and loop recapture, it applies a mechanical force to the DNA, loosening the interactions between the histone octamers and the DNA. In this way, the opened regions of DNA become accessible to various transcription factors, RNA polymerase II, and other regulatory proteins. The subunits of this complex recognize specific histone modifications and DNA sequences: bromodomain-containing subunits (BRG1, BRM, PBRM1, BRD7/9) bind to acetylated histones, while PHD fingers (e.g., DPF2/DPF3) specifically recognize acetylated H3 histone tails. Additionally, the ARID1A/B and ARID2 subunits bind to AT-rich DNA regions. What distinguishes the BAF complex from other chromatin remodeling complexes is its ability not only to shift nucleosomes but also to completely evict histone octamers when necessary. Additionally, the BAF complex functions in balance with Polycomb complexes, which mediate gene repression through mechanisms such as H3K27 methylation. When BAF function is impaired while Polycomb activity remains intact, gene silencing persists, leading to the repression of tumor suppressor genes and potentially contributing to oncogenic outcomes.

The BAF complex in cells plays roles in various processes such as cell differentiation, development, and maintenance of viability. Specifically, subunits like BRG1 and SMARCC1 maintain pluripotency, subunit switching in neuronal cells enables neuronal differentiation, and it regulates tissue-specific gene expression in muscle and heart. In adult cells, the complex functions in DNA damage repair, cell cycle control, and preservation of cell identity.

== Roles in disease ==
The mammalian BAF complex is disrupted frequently in human disease, and mutations in the subunits of the BAF complex have been responsible for causing roughly 20% of all human tumors. Subunits of the BAF complex like ARID1A, SMARCB1, SMARCA4, PBRM1, and ARID2 are considered to be tumor suppressors and are often affected by loss of function mutations across cancers.

Because the BAF complex is modular, phenotypes in disease can indicate which subunit is altered. Different subunits direct targeting and activity at enhancers, so mutations in different subunits have different methods, impact on tumorigenesis, and therapeutic vulnerabilities. Through destabilizing the cBAF complex and the accessibility of enhancers, ARID1A, for instance, is mutated in nearly half of all ovarian clear-cell and endometrioid carcinomas and is associated with loss-of-function defects that occur early in the progression of malignant transformation of endometriosis. The majority of ARID1A mutations are truncating, leading to the protein being lost; however, without ARID1A, cBAF shifts to using ARID1B, which has far less abundance at enhancers, all the while decreasing the accessibility of the chromatin.

Beyond defects that target enhancers, the loss of structural subunits removes the platform that recruits BRG1/BRM onto the chromatin, diminishing remodeling at genes involved in checkpoint and differentiation. Particularly, SMARCB1 is biallelically inactivated in nearly all malignant rhabdoid tumors, which demonstrates one of the first genetic links between loss of the BAF complex and severe pediatric cancers. SMARCA4 loss of function can disable the very ATPase involved in remodeling in BAF and cause small cell carcinoma of the ovary, hypercalcemic type, while recurring as mutations in non-small cell lung cancers, where the restriction of nucleosome mobility can silence the existing tumor suppressor genes.

Carcinogenic potential is not restricted to the cBAF complex, however, since over 40% of clear-cell renal carcinomas are characterized by PBRM1 deletions/truncations. The loss of bromodomain in PBRM1 reduces the ability to recognize acetylated histones, causing a change in gene expression. Although they are less frequent, ARID2 mutations, also disrupting PBAF-derived chromatin regulation, play a part in hepatocellular carcinoma development like that of hepatitis C through defectively recruiting chromatin remodelers to the tumor suppressors that restrain uncontrolled proliferation.

Germline disruption of the BAF complex's chromatin-remodeling specific complexes is a central cause of Mendelian neurodevelopmental disease. Clinically, ARID1B loss-of-function mutations are present in nearly two-thirds of cases of the Coffin–Siris spectrum, impeding proper intellectual development, language delays in expression, increased seizure susceptibility, and frequent midline neurological implications such as corpus-callosal defects. Other subunits of the BAF complex, including ARID1A, SMARCB1, SMARCE1, and SMARCA4, can also cause Coffin–Siris–like phenotypes when mutated, underscoring the specific roles of this remodeling machinery in human neural development. By contrast, Nicolaides–Baraitser syndrome is caused primarily by de novo missense variants in SMARCA2, which produce severe intellectual disability, distal-limb anomalies, and sparse hair.

=== Role of ARID1A as tumor suppressor ===
ARID1A, as part of cBAF, possesses an essential tumor-suppressing activity that is frequently mutated in various human cancers, including in 46–57% of ovarian clear cell carcinomas and 30% of endometrioid carcinomas as well as in prostate, breast, pancreatic and more cancers. One of ARID1A's several pivotal functions is its ability to direct cBAF to the enhancers, promoting oncogenesis through faulty genomic regulation. Although ARID1A loss on its own has been shown as insufficient for tumorigenesis, it can induce ovarian adenocarcinomas when paired with PIK3CA activation, after having released IL-6 and activated NF-κB. This cooperation between PI3K and ARID1A is prominent because PIK3CA supplies proliferation of cells and the loss of ARID1A changes the interactions between enhancers and inflammation within the cells, creating a feed-forward loop between IL-6, STAT3 and NFkB. Namely, when ARID1A and PIK3CA are mutated, there is a promotion of IL-6 and activation of STAT3 because of the newly established inflammatory cytokine loop. In this signalling state, the interaction increases between the tumor and the environment surrounding it, recruiting pro-tumor myeloid cells.

Because ARID1A loss with PIK3CA activation increases PI3K–AKT signalling, EZH2 blockade that restores the endogenous inhibitor PIK3IP1 provides a PIK3IP1-dependent vulnerability in ARID1A-mutant systems. Through reactivating tumor suppressors like PIK3IP1, which can represent a potential therapeutic strategy due to its ability to limit PI3K–AKT signalling, EZH2 inhibition is able to target specifically cancer cells that are ARID1A-mutant tumors.

ARID1A loss also increases the genomic occupancy of CTCF, and this gain contributes to the proliferative advantage of ARID1A-deficient cells; co-occurring CTCF alteration is associated with more favorable clinical outcome than ARID1A loss alone.

ARID1A deficiency also limits interferon signaling, which is critical in the human immune response, as well as invasion of CD8^{+} T-cells. Thus, the cell can pass through most immune checkpoints because the loss of ARID1A leads to closing antigen-related enhancers. In prostate tumours, ARID1A deletion combines with loss of PTEN to increase the amount of tumor growth as well as PMN-MDSCs infiltration through continued NF-κB activation. Inflammatory IKKβ signalling phosphorylates ARID1A, degrading the protein as well as silencing of A20 enhancer activity, which further boosts suppression from immune NF-κB, creating a feedback loop of NF-κB.

=== SMARCB1 and rhabdoid tumors ===
In malignant rhabdoid tumors (MRTs) as well as atypical teratoid or rhabdoid tumors (ATRTs), SMARCB1 acts as a major tumor suppressor that shows bi-allelic inactivation in almost 95% of patients. Without SMARCB1, the chromatin is repressed by Polycomb repressive complexes because SMARCB1 can mark specific genes for silencing and can even compact the chromatin further. In contrast to most cases of cancer, invasive childhood neurological malignancies can arise through even the smallest change, sometimes with SMARCB1 as the sole driver event. In fact, studies in mice have demonstrated that SMARCB1 functions as a tumor suppressor with two major pathways for destruction: if deleted heterozygously, there could be sporadic MRT development, whereas conditional homozygous loss leads to fast-spreading lymphomas, demonstrating that SMARCB1 by itself can be enough for tumorigenesis. Rhabdoid tumorigenesis, however, can only happen in particular parts of development. For instance, the loss of SMARCB1 affects embryonic progenitors, like neural stem cells or primordial germ cells, more than already differentiated cells, indicating the role of age in tissue tropism of RTs. The activity of enhancers requires SMARCB1, and, as evidence, its loss can stifle the ability of genes to allow cells to differentiate. Consequently, rhabdoid tumor cells are specifically vulnerable to the ratios of other SWI/SNF proteins. For instance, rhabdoid tumors without SMARCB1 specifically require BRD9, with BRD9 inhibition leading to cytotoxicity within these cells. By contrast, the loss of SMARCB1 lowers the ability of the BAF complex to antagonize Polycomb repressive complexes, expanding the domain of H3K27me3 domains by allowing PRC2 to spread H3K27me3 at promoters where there are differentiation genes. This creates a therapeutic vulnerability to EZH2 inhibition, a strategy that is supported by clinical evaluation with agents such as tazemetostat. Although rare cases can include the loss of SMARCA4 rather than SMARCB1, the resulting defects in chromatin remodeling are very similar, indicating potentially shared therapeutic targets.

=== SMARCA4 and cancer ===
SMARCA4, otherwise called BRG1, is one of the most integral tumor suppressors in the BAF complex, and its loss can lead to mechanistically different but functionally similar types of aggressive malignancies. In hypercalcemic ovarian small cell carcinoma, biallelic mutations of SMARCA4 gene, which leads to the loss of BRG1, are extremely widespread, as shown in ovary small cell carcinoma, where 94% of the cases have SMARCA4 mutation. In fact, identification of the genetic status of SMARCA4 is one of the criteria/the main criterion for confirming the disease. Moreover, blocking a second, compensatory pathway that the cells rely on after the first copy of the gene is lost stands out as a therapeutic possibility. When SMARCA4 is lost, the ATPase activity of the BAF complex is compromised, with only SMARCA2 compensating as the ATPase subunit in SMARCA4-dependent cells, resulting in altered enhancers and promoter accessibility, so transcription factors that would otherwise have access to DNA no longer reach their targets. In non-small cell lung cancer, SMARCA4 mutations are present in about 5–10% of tumors, especially in those with undifferentiated or rhabdoid phenotype. At a more cellular level, BRG1 loss disrupts chromatin accessibility that cells obtain from SWI/SNF, reducing DNA repair through p53 and BRCA1, as well as activating previously inactivated oncogenic MYC programs. Activation of MYC programs accelerates the cell cycle, increasing transcriptional demand, which promotes growth but also elevates replication stress. These changes collectively destabilize the genome and lead to dedifferentiation through loss of H3K27 acetylation. These mutations may lead to therapeutic susceptibilities, where SMARCA4-deficient cells face replication stress as well as chromatin compaction, making them highly sensitive to ATR inhibitors. The said replication stress can cause DNA breaks and chromosome instability that drive tumor initiation.

=== Therapeutic strategies ===
Mutations of the SWI/SNF complex have provided the initial push for finding therapeutic measures to target cancers where ARID1A is mutated. Common ARID1A loss-of-function cancers allow for specific properties that are being examined to understand more about the role of mutations in subunits of SWI/SNF in the proliferation of cancer cells. Epigenetic therapy is one of the advancements made in this matter, where it was found that cancer cells lacking ARID1A can die when EZH2 is inhibited. In particular, ARID1A-mutant ovarian clear cell carcinomas show dramatic regression when there is the inhibition of EZH2. ARID1A-loss malignancies are similarly very reliant on ATR-mediated DNA damage checkpoints. As such, inhibition of the ATR kinase acts specifically to induce DNA damage, premature mitosis, and cell death of ARID1A-loss models, which has prompted clinical studies. ARID1A loss decreases homologous recombination repair, which repairs harmful DNA breaks, so the cells are acutely susceptible to inhibition of PARP, a protein found in the cell nucleus that can detect said DNA damage.

Besides impacting the cell cycle alongside DNA repair tracks, ARID1A inactivation produces metabolic instabilities as well. ARID1A-mutant tumors can become addicted to glutamine as a side-product of glycolysis down-regulation in their cells as well as enhanced glutaminase dependence. Therefore, inhibition of GLS1, the enzyme that converts glutamine to glutamate, causes metabolic collapse. Other BAF complex subunits are also being used for research into cancer therapy. In fact, loss of SMARCB1, as seen in cancerous rhabdoid tumors and epithelioid sarcoma, causes early dependence on EZH2 activity. Similarly, inhibition of EZH2 by the EZH2 inhibitor tazemetostat has shown clinical activity as an approved treatment of SMARCB1-deficient sarcomas. Random mutations of the PBAF sub-complex also offer hints at immune therapy since mutations of the PBRM1 gene in renal cell carcinomas are related to improved response to PD-1 blockade, which uses inhibitors that target PD-1 protein in T cells, allowing the immune system to attack the said cancer cells.

== History ==
SWI/SNF complexes were discovered in the 1980s in yeast, Saccharomyces cerevisiae. The "SWI" (Switch) and "SNF" (Sucrose Non-Fermenting) genes were named for their roles in mating type switching and sucrose metabolism, respectively. These genes' crucial involvement in chromatin remodeling was revealed when their loss of function interfered with related transcriptional processes. In the late 1980s, complexes analogous to the yeast SWI/SNF were also identified in the fruit fly Drosophila melanogaster, based on their genetic antagonism to Polycomb-mediated gene repression. The central ATPase subunit of these complexes is encoded by the brahma (brm) gene, from which the name BAP (Brahma-associated proteins) complex is derived. In addition to BAP, D. melanogaster has a second BRM-containing complex known as PBAP (Polybromo-associated BAP). Although both complexes function to counteract Polycomb silencing, they exhibit distinct roles in different biological processes.

The identification of SWI/SNF-like complexes in mammalian cells became possible shortly after the molecular cloning of genes homologous to the yeast SWI2/SNF2 genes. Two ATPase subunits of the SNF2 family, BRG1 (Brahma-related gene 1) and hBRM (human Brahma), which use ATP to remodel nucleosomes, were identified in the early 1990s. These findings demonstrated that SWI/SNF complexes are evolutionarily conserved in mammals. Subsequent biochemical purification studies revealed the existence of two distinct complexes in mammalian cells containing either BRG1 or BRM, each assembling with different and partially overlapping subunits. These complexes are collectively referred to as BAF. Compared to the yeast SWI/SNF complex, BAF complexes exhibit much greater structural and functional diversity (Table 2). This diversity allows them to regulate specific transcriptional processes across various cell types and developmental stages. To improve upon the comparison between different species that is given from this diversity, the SWI/SNF Infobase was developed as a comprehensive database containing subunit-specific protein and nucleic acid sequence information from approximately 20 different organisms. Over time, it became evident that these complexes can change significantly, especially in development and differentiation. For example, during neural development, a transition occurs from the neural progenitor BAF complex to the neuronal BAF complex, involving subunit-level changes such as the replacement of BAF53A (ACTL6A) with BAF53B (ACTL6B). In recent years, high-throughput sequencing and genome analyses have further revealed that BAF complexes have tumor suppressor roles. Notably, genes encoding several subunits, including ARID1A, SMARCB1, PBRM1, and SMARCA4 (which encodes BRG1), have been found to be frequently mutated in various human cancers.

Table 2. Cross-species organization of SWI/SNF complexes

Feature	Yeast (S. cerevisiae)	Drosophila melanogaster	Mammals
ATPase subunit	Snf2	Brahma (BRM)	BRG1 (SMARCA4), BRM (SMARCA2)
Number of subunits	~11	~12-14	15-17
Complex diversity	One main complex	Two complexes (BAP and PBAP)	Three complexes (cBAF, PBAF, ncBAF)
Evolutionary conservation	Basic structural conservation	Moderate similarity	High complexity and specialization
Functional divergence	Gene expression	Developmental gene regulation	Differentiation, cancer, DNA repair
