= Trithorax-group proteins =

Type of proteins that maintain gene expression

Trithorax-group proteins (TrxG) are a heterogeneous collection of proteins whose main action is to maintain gene expression. They can be categorized into three general classes based on molecular function:

1. histone-modifying TrxG proteins
2. chromatin-remodeling TrxG proteins
3. DNA-binding TrxG proteins,

plus other TrxG proteins not categorized in the first three classes.

== Discovery ==
The founding member of TrxG proteins, trithorax (trx), was discovered ~1978 by Philip Ingham as part of his doctoral thesis while a graduate student in the laboratory of J.R.S. Whittle at the University of Sussex. Histone-lysine N-methyltransferase 2A is the human homolog of trx.

Members of Trithorax Group Proteins:
Name	Symbol(s)
absent, small or homeotic discs 1	ash1
absent, small or homeotic discs 2	ash2
brahma	brm
Brahma associated protein 55kD	Bap55
Brahma associated protein 60 kD	Bap60
dalao	dalao
domino	dom
Enhancer of bithorax	E(bx)
enhancer of yellow 3	SAYP or e(y)3
eyelid	eld or osa
female sterile (1) homeotic	fs(1)h
grappa	gpp
Imitation SWI	Iswi
kismet	kis
little imaginal discs	lid
lola like	lolal
modifier of mdg 4	mod(mdg4), E(var)3-93D, or doom
moira	mor
Nucleosome remodeling factor-38kD	Nurf38
trithorax	trx
Trithorax like	Trl
Ubiquitously transcribed tetratricopeptide repeat, X chromosome	Utx
verthandi	vtd
zeste	z

The table contains names of Drosophila TrxG members. Homologs in other species may have different names.

== Function ==
Trithorax-group proteins typically function in large complexes formed with other proteins. The complexes formed by TrxG proteins are divided into two groups: histone-modifying complexes and ATP-dependent chromatin-remodeling complexes. The main function of TrxG proteins, along with polycomb group (PcG) proteins, is regulating gene expression. Whereas PcG proteins are typically associated with gene silencing, TrxG proteins are most commonly linked to gene activation. The trithorax complex activates gene transcription by inducing trimethylation of lysine 4 of histone H3 (H3K4me3) at specific sites in chromatin recognized by the complex. Ash1 domain is involved in H3K36 methylation. Trithorax complex also interacts with CBP (CREB binding protein) which is an acetyltransferase to acetylate H3K27. This gene activation is reinforced by acetylation of histone H4. The actions of TrxG proteins are often described as 'antagonistic' of PcG proteins function. Aside from gene regulation, evidence suggests TrxG proteins are also involved in other processes including apoptosis, cancer, and stress responses.

== Role in development ==
During development, TrxG proteins maintain activation of required genes, particularly the Hox genes, after maternal factors are depleted. This is accomplished by preserving the epigenetic marks, specifically H3K4me3, established by maternally-supplied factors. TrxG proteins are also implicated in X-chromosome inactivation, which occurs during early embryogenesis. As of 2011 it is unclear whether TrxG activity is required in every cell during the entire development of an organism or only during certain stages in certain cell types.

== See also ==
- HIstome
- Histone acetyltransferase
- Histone deacetylases
- Histone methyltransferase
- Histone-Modifying Enzymes
- Nucleosome
- PRMT4 pathway
