= CHD1 =

Chromatin remodeling protein that is widely conserved across many eukaryotic organisms

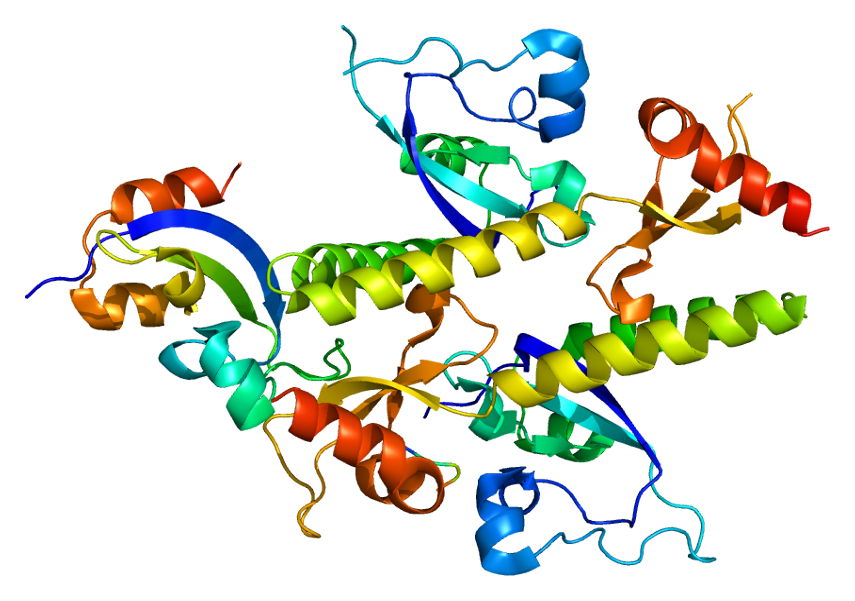

Identifiers
- Aliases: CHD1, chromodomain helicase DNA binding protein 1, PILBOS, CHD-1
- External IDs: OMIM: 602118; MGI: 88393; GeneCards: CHD1
Available structures
PDB	Ortholog search: PDBe RCSB
PDB	List of PDB id codes 2B2T, 2B2U, 2B2V, 2B2W, 2B2Y, 4B4C, 4NW2, 4O42, 5AFW, 2N39

Gene location (Human)
Chr.	Chromosome 5 (human)
Band	5q15-q21.1	Start	98,853,985 bp
Band	5q15-q21.1	End	98,929,007 bp

Gene location (Mouse)
Chr.	Chromosome 17 (mouse)
Band	17 A2|17 8.95 cM	Start	15,925,229 bp
Band	17 A2|17 8.95 cM	End	15,992,872 bp
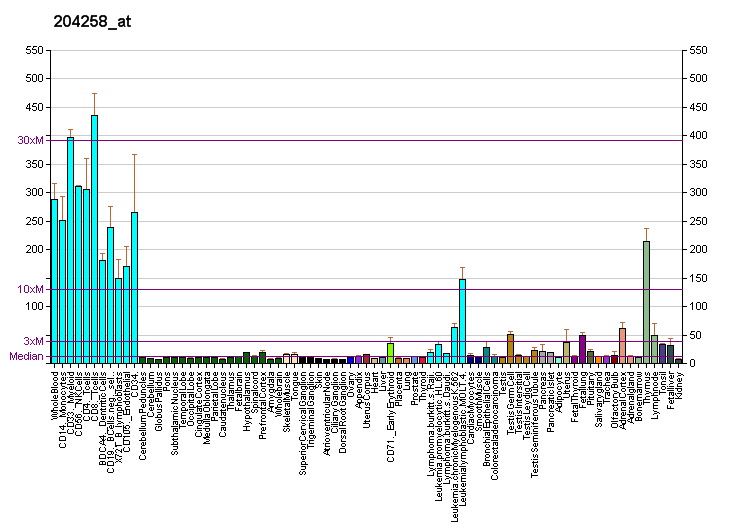
RNA expression pattern
Bgee	Human / Mouse (ortholog); Top expressed in: Achilles tendon; tail of epididymis; epithelium of colon; bone marrow; thymus; monocyte; left ovary; ventricular zone; caput epididymis; right ovary / Top expressed in: tail of embryo; genital tubercle; Ileal epithelium; thymus; renal corpuscle; epiblast; spermatocyte; condyle; fossa; internal carotid artery; More reference expression data
BioGPS	More reference expression data
Gene ontology
Molecular function	DNA binding; DNA helicase activity; nucleotide binding; protein binding; hydrolase activity; ATP binding; helicase activity; methylated histone binding
Cellular component	cytoplasm; nucleus; fibrillar center; nucleoplasm
Biological process	regulation of transcription by RNA polymerase II; chromatin remodeling; regulation of transcription, DNA-templated; positive regulation by host of viral transcription; transcription, DNA-templated; DNA duplex unwinding; chromatin organization
Sources:Amigo / QuickGO
Orthologs
Databases	NCBI: entry; OMA: entry
Species	Human	Mouse
Entrez	1105	12648
Ensembl	ENSG00000153922	ENSMUSG00000023852
UniProt	O14646	P40201
RefSeq (mRNA)	NM_001270; NM_001364113; NM_001376194	NM_007690
RefSeq (protein)	NP_001261; NP_001351042; NP_001363123	NP_031716
Location (UCSC)	Chr 5: 98.85 – 98.93 Mb	Chr 17: 15.93 – 15.99 Mb
PubMed search
- Wikidata
View/Edit Human	View/Edit Mouse

The Chromodomain-Helicase DNA-binding 1 is a protein that, in humans, is encoded by the CHD1 gene. CHD1 is a chromatin remodeling protein that is widely conserved across many eukaryotic organisms, from yeast to humans. CHD1 is named for three of its protein domains: two tandem chromodomains, its ATPase catalytic domain, and its DNA-binding domain (Figure 1).

The CHD1 remodeler binds nucleosomes and induces local changes in nucleosome positioning through ATP hydrolysis coupled to DNA translocation of the DNA across the histone proteins. The catalytic domain of CHD1, which is highly conserved across all nucleosome remodelers, is a two-lobed structure. CHD1 relies on the DNA-binding domain, which binds DNA in a sequence non-specific manner, to help regulate spacing.

CHD1 is a member of a large family of CHD nucleosome remodelers, though yeast has only one CHD protein, called Chd1. Humans and mice, by contrast, have nine CHD proteins that are homologous to S. cerevisiae Chd1, but each have their own characteristic functions. There are a total of three subfamilies of CHD remodelers in humans. CHD1, together with CHD2, belong to subfamily 1.

== Structure ==
CHD1 contains two N-terminal tandem chromodomains, a SNF2-related domain, a helicase C domain, a DNA-binding CDH1/2 SANT-Helical linker, and a disordered C-terminal region.

Figure 1. Schematic of the Chd1 protein, with tandem chromodomains (purple), ATPase catalytic domain (orange) and DNA binding domain (pink) bound to the nucleosome (DNA in blue, histones in green).

In 2017, the structure of S. cerevisiae Chd1 bound to the nucleosome has been obtained using single-particle cryo-EM by Lucas Farnung in the lab of Patrick Cramer (Figure 2). In 2025, the laboratory of Lucas Farnung at Harvard Medical School provided the structure of human CHD1 bound to a nucleosome.

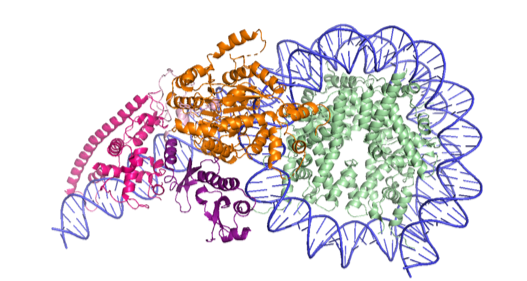
Figure 2. Cryo-EM structure of Chd1 bound to the nucleosome, including the chromodomains (purple), ATPase domain (orange) and DNA-binding domain (pink), with histone octamer (green) and DNA (blue). PDB: 5O9G.

== Function ==
CHD1 is essential for embryonic stem cell pluripotency in mice by maintaining an open euchromatic chromatin state. Chd1 helps maintain boundaries between histone modifications H3K4me3 and H3K36me3. It has also been shown that CHD1 is important in dictating the transcriptional landscape by promoting differentiation of osteoblasts, or differentiating bone cells. Studies in both yeast and humans have found that Chd1 is recruited to DNA damage sites, where it promotes the opening of chromatin and the recruitment of DNA repair factors, thus facilitating DNA repair by homologous recombination.

== Interactions ==
CHD1 has several genetic interactions with numerous factors involved in chromatin maintenance and transcription. Notably, the chromodomains of human CHD1 are capable of binding the histone modification histone H3 Lysine 4 trimethyl (H3K4me3). It is thought that human CHD1 preferentially binds this histone modification, which is primarily located at the 5' regions of genes, as a mechanism of recruitment to those genomic loci. However, in yeast it has been shown that Chd1 interacts with Rtf1, a transcription elongation factor and member of the Paf1 Complex (Paf1C). Structural information has shown that the Chd1 chromodomains in yeast do not bind H3K4me3. The human protein binds H3K4me3. Human CHD1 shows little difference in binding and remodeling activity on H3K4me3-containing versus non-H3K4 trimethylated nucleososomes in vitro.

CHD1 has been shown to interact with Nuclear receptor co-repressor 1.

== Clinical significance ==
CHD1 is most notably implicated in prostate cancer development. In about 10% of all prostate cancers, CHD1 is mutated or deleted. In prostate cancer cells CHD1 also has an essential relationship with another cancer driver, the PTEN locus. In studies of prostate cancer patient data, when PTEN is mutated, Chd1 gains an essential role and is never deleted. Thus, CHD1 misfunction is evident in the majority of prostate cancers. Further, mutation of CHD1 alone is sufficient in some mice models to induce prostate tumorigenesis.
