= CHD7 =

Protein-coding gene in humans

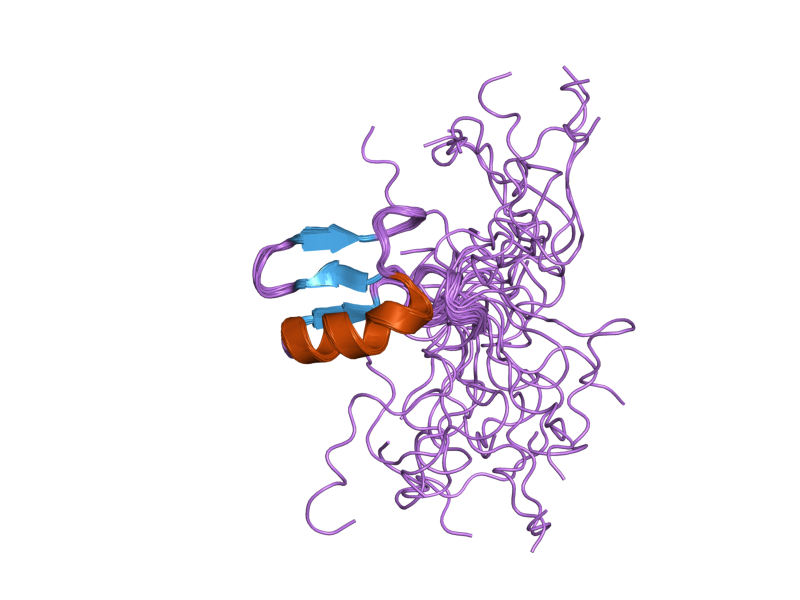

Identifiers
- Aliases: CHD7, CRG, HH5, IS3, KAL5, chromodomain helicase DNA binding protein 7
- External IDs: OMIM: 608892; MGI: 2444748; GeneCards: CHD7
Available structures
PDB	Ortholog search: PDBe RCSB
PDB	List of PDB id codes 2CKC, 2V0E, 2V0F

Gene location (Human)
Chr.	Chromosome 8 (human)
Band	8q12.2	Start	60,678,740 bp
Band	8q12.2	End	60,868,028 bp

Gene location (Mouse)
Chr.	Chromosome 4 (mouse)
Band	4 A1|4 3.68 cM	Start	8,690,406 bp
Band	4 A1|4 3.68 cM	End	8,867,659 bp
RNA expression pattern
Bgee	Human / Mouse (ortholog); Top expressed in: secondary oocyte; cerebellar vermis; sural nerve; inferior ganglion of vagus nerve; external globus pallidus; ventricular zone; pars reticulata; subthalamic nucleus; ventral tegmental area; embryo / Top expressed in: neural layer of retina; Rostral migratory stream; tail of embryo; zygote; external carotid artery; genital tubercle; internal carotid artery; ventricular zone; secondary oocyte; granulocyte; More reference expression data
BioGPS	n/a
Gene ontology
Molecular function	nucleotide binding; DNA binding; helicase activity; chromatin binding; RNA polymerase II cis-regulatory region sequence-specific DNA binding; hydrolase activity, acting on acid anhydrides; protein binding; hydrolase activity; ATP binding; promoter-specific chromatin binding
Cellular component	nucleus; nucleoplasm; nucleolus
Biological process	skeletal system development; olfactory behavior; semicircular canal morphogenesis; regulation of transcription, DNA-templated; cognition; locomotory behavior; adult heart development; cranial nerve development; heart morphogenesis; olfactory nerve development; in utero embryonic development; hearing; blood circulation; transcription, DNA-templated; epithelium development; genitalia development; limb development; ear morphogenesis; regulation of growth hormone secretion; central nervous system development; T cell differentiation; face development; blood vessel development; retina development in camera-type eye; inner ear morphogenesis; artery morphogenesis; positive regulation of multicellular organism growth; rRNA processing; camera-type eye development; olfactory bulb development; nose development; female genitalia development; regulation of neurogenesis; adult walking behavior; embryonic hindlimb morphogenesis; ventricular trabecula myocardium morphogenesis; tissue remodeling; aorta morphogenesis; positive regulation of transcription by RNA polymerase II; right ventricular compact myocardium morphogenesis; regulation of release of sequestered calcium ion into cytosol by sarcoplasmic reticulum; aorta development; atrioventricular canal development; blood vessel remodeling; chromatin remodeling; cardiac septum morphogenesis; innervation; chromatin organization; roof of mouth development; secondary palate development; response to bacterium
Sources:Amigo / QuickGO
Orthologs
Databases	NCBI: entry; OMA: entry
Species	Human	Mouse
Entrez	55636	320790
Ensembl	ENSG00000171316	ENSMUSG00000041235
UniProt	Q9P2D1	A2AJK6
RefSeq (mRNA)	NM_017780; NM_001316690; NM_017783	NM_001033395; NM_001081417; NM_001277149; NM_001355382
RefSeq (protein)	NP_001303619; NP_060250	NP_001264078; NP_001342311
Location (UCSC)	Chr 8: 60.68 – 60.87 Mb	Chr 4: 8.69 – 8.87 Mb
PubMed search
- Wikidata
View/Edit Human	View/Edit Mouse

Chromodomain-helicase-DNA-binding protein 7 is an ATP-dependent 'chromatin' or 'nucleosome' remodeling factor that in humans is encoded by the CHD7 gene.

CHD7 is an ATP-dependent chromatin remodeler homologous to the Drosophila trithorax-group protein Kismet. Mutations in CHD7 are associated with CHARGE syndrome. This protein belongs to a larger group of ATP-dependent chromatin remodeling complexes, the CHD subfamily.

== Clinical ==
Mutations in this gene have been associated with the CHARGE syndrome.
