= EP400 =

Protein-coding gene in humans

Identifiers
- Aliases: EP400, CAGH32, P400, TNRC12, E1A binding protein p400
- External IDs: OMIM: 606265; MGI: 1276124; GeneCards: EP400

Gene location (Human)
Chr.	Chromosome 12 (human)
Band	12q24.33	Start	131,949,942 bp
Band	12q24.33	End	132,080,460 bp

Gene location (Mouse)
Chr.	Chromosome 5 (mouse)
Band	5|5 F	Start	110,812,239 bp
Band	5|5 F	End	110,918,583 bp
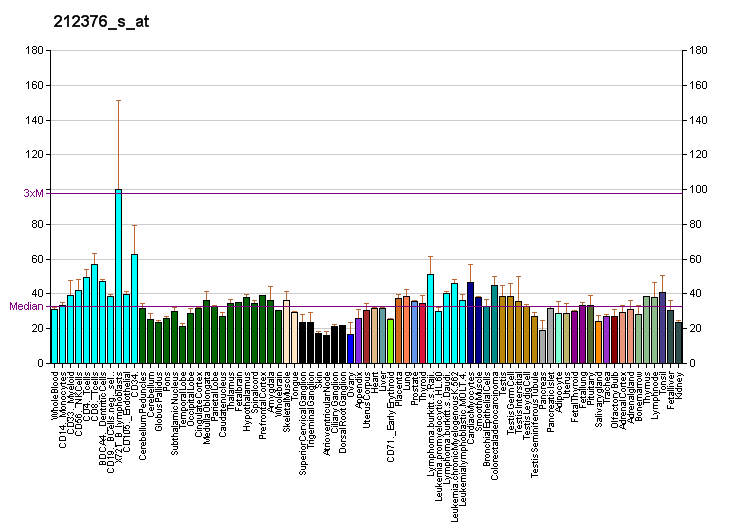
RNA expression pattern
Bgee	Human / Mouse (ortholog); Top expressed in: tendon of biceps brachii; sural nerve; secondary oocyte; ventricular zone; internal globus pallidus; right uterine tube; right hemisphere of cerebellum; left ovary; testicle; right ovary / Top expressed in: zygote; spermatocyte; seminiferous tubule; tail of embryo; ventricular zone; genital tubercle; Rostral migratory stream; secondary oocyte; spermatid; neural layer of retina; More reference expression data
BioGPS	More reference expression data
Gene ontology
Molecular function	DNA binding; nucleotide binding; protein antigen binding; chromatin binding; protein binding; ATP binding; hydrolase activity; helicase activity
Cellular component	NuA4 histone acetyltransferase complex; nuclear speck; nucleus; Swr1 complex; nucleoplasm
Biological process	histone H2A acetylation; histone H4 acetylation; chromatin organization
Sources:Amigo / QuickGO
Orthologs
Databases	NCBI: entry; OMA: entry
Species	Human	Mouse
Entrez	57634	75560
Ensembl	ENSG00000183495	ENSMUSG00000029505
UniProt	Q96L91	Q8CHI8
RefSeq (mRNA)	NM_015409	NM_029337; NM_173066
RefSeq (protein)	NP_056224	NP_083613; NP_775089
Location (UCSC)	Chr 12: 131.95 – 132.08 Mb	Chr 5: 110.81 – 110.92 Mb
PubMed search
- Wikidata
View/Edit Human	View/Edit Mouse

E1A-binding protein p400 is a protein that in humans is encoded by the EP400 gene.

== Interactions ==
EP400 has been shown to interact with Transformation/transcription domain-associated protein, RuvB-like 1 and Myc.
