= Transformation/transcription domain-associated protein =

Protein-coding gene in the species Homo sapiens

TRRAP

Identifiers
- Aliases: TRRAP, PAF350/400, PAF400, STAF40, TR-AP, Tra1, transformation/transcription domain associated protein, DEDDFA, DFNA75
- External IDs: OMIM: 603015; MGI: 2153272; GeneCards: TRRAP

Gene location (Human)
Chr.	Chromosome 7 (human)
Band	7q22.1	Start	98,877,933 bp
Band	7q22.1	End	99,050,831 bp

Gene location (Mouse)
Chr.	Chromosome 5 (mouse)
Band	5|5 G2	Start	144,704,542 bp
Band	5|5 G2	End	144,796,588 bp
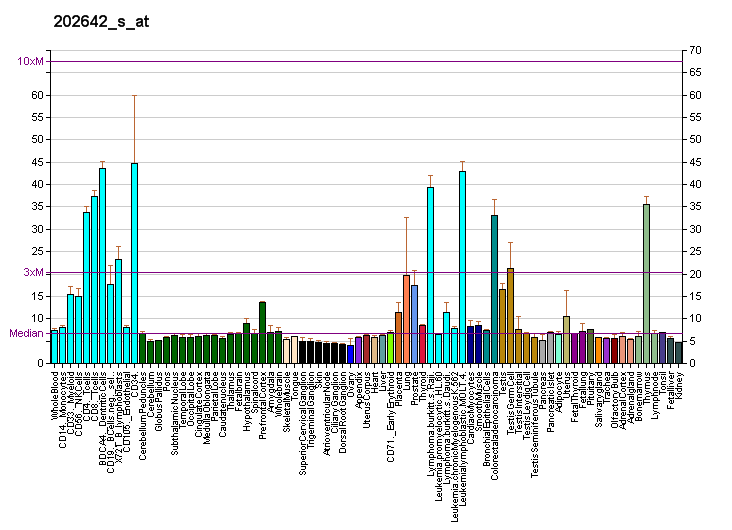

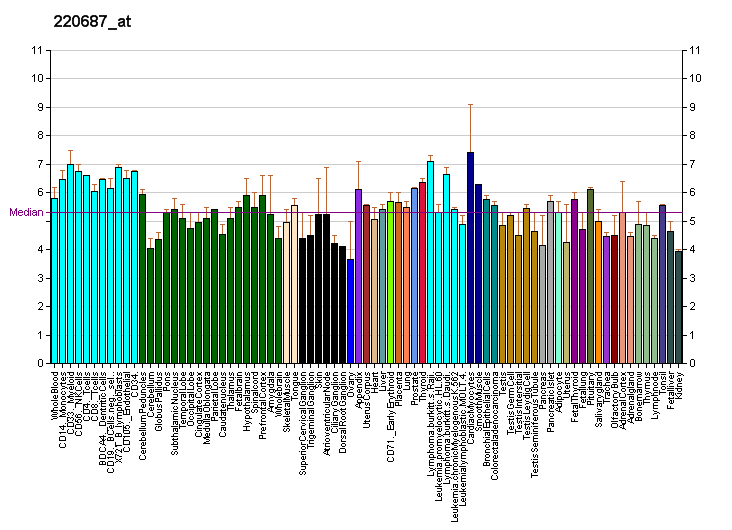

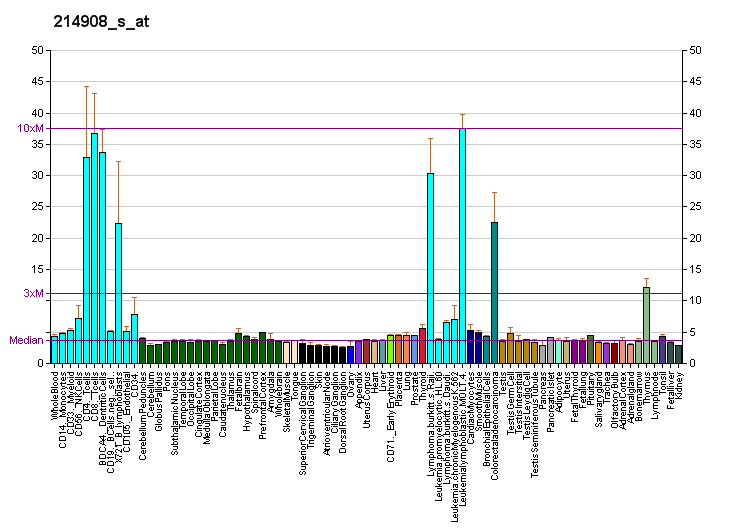
RNA expression pattern
Bgee	Human / Mouse (ortholog); Top expressed in: ventricular zone; sural nerve; ganglionic eminence; anterior pituitary; buccal mucosa cell; skin of thigh; testicle; stromal cell of endometrium; right hemisphere of cerebellum; granulocyte / Top expressed in: yolk sac; Rostral migratory stream; ventricular zone; internal carotid artery; neural layer of retina; anterior amygdaloid area; stroma of bone marrow; maxillary prominence; mandibular prominence; nucleus accumbens; More reference expression data
BioGPS	More reference expression data
Gene ontology
Molecular function	transcription coregulator activity; protein binding; thiol-dependent deubiquitinase; kinase activity
Cellular component	Golgi apparatus; transcription factor TFTC complex; NuA4 histone acetyltransferase complex; nucleoplasm; nucleus; Swr1 complex; histone acetyltransferase complex; SAGA complex
Biological process	regulation of transcription, DNA-templated; histone H2A acetylation; transcription, DNA-templated; histone deubiquitination; histone H4 acetylation; phosphorylation; beta-catenin-TCF complex assembly; histone acetylation; protein deubiquitination; DNA repair; chromatin organization
Sources:Amigo / QuickGO
Orthologs
Databases	NCBI: entry; OMA: entry
Species	Human	Mouse
Entrez	8295	100683
Ensembl	ENSG00000196367	ENSMUSG00000045482
UniProt	Q9Y4A5	Q80YV3
RefSeq (mRNA)	NM_003496; NM_001244580; NM_001375524	NM_001081362; NM_133901
RefSeq (protein)	NP_001231509; NP_003487; NP_001362453	n/a
Location (UCSC)	Chr 7: 98.88 – 99.05 Mb	Chr 5: 144.7 – 144.8 Mb
PubMed search
- Wikidata
View/Edit Human	View/Edit Mouse

Transformation/transcription domain-associated protein, also known as TRRAP, is a protein that in humans is encoded by the TRRAP gene. TRRAP belongs to the phosphatidylinositol 3-kinase-related kinase protein family.

== Function ==
TRRAP is an adaptor protein, which is found in various multiprotein chromatin complexes with histone acetyltransferase activity (HAT), which in turn is responsible for epigenetic transcription activation. TRRAP has a central role in MYC (c-Myc) transcription activation, and also participates in cell transformation by MYC. It is required for p53/TP53-, E2F1-, and E2F4-mediated transcription activation. It is also involved in transcription activation mediated by the adenovirus E1A, a viral oncoprotein that deregulates transcription of key genes.

TRRAP is also required for the mitotic checkpoint and normal cell cycle progression. The MRN complex (composed of MRE11, RAD50, and NBS1) is involved in the detection and repair of DNA double-strand breaks (DSBs). TRRAP associates with the MRN complex and when TRRAP is removed, the complex shows reduced cDNA end-joining activity. Hence, TRRAP may function as a link between DSB repair and chromatin remodeling.

== Interactions ==
Transformation/transcription domain-associated protein has been shown to interact with:

- ACTL6A,
- EP400,
- MAX,
- Myc,
- PCAF,
- SUPT3H, and
- TAF9. and
