= RUVBL2 =

Protein-coding gene in humans

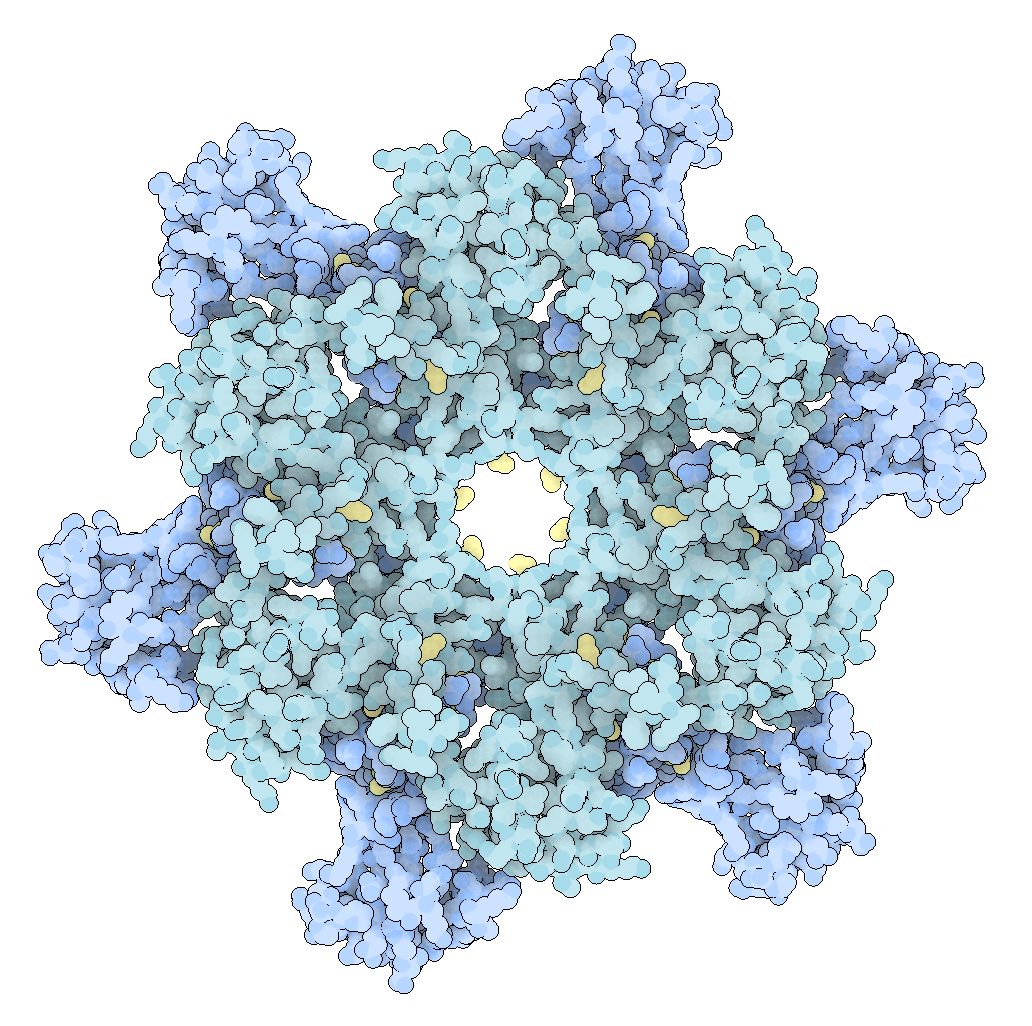

Identifiers
- Aliases: RUVBL2, ECP51, INO80J, REPTIN, RVB2, TIH2, TIP48, TIP49B, CGI-46, ECP-51, TAP54-beta, RuvB like AAA ATPase 2
- External IDs: OMIM: 604788; MGI: 1342299; GeneCards: RUVBL2
Available structures
PDB	Ortholog search: PDBe RCSB
PDB	List of PDB id codes 2CQA, 2XSZ, 3UK6
Enzyme activity
EC #	BRENDA	ExPASy	KEGG	MetaCyc
3.6.4.12	↗	↗	↗	↗

Gene location (Human)
Chr.	Chromosome 19 (human)
Band	19q13.33	Start	48,993,562 bp
Band	19q13.33	End	49,015,970 bp

Gene location (Mouse)
Chr.	Chromosome 7 (mouse)
Band	7|7 B3	Start	45,071,184 bp
Band	7|7 B3	End	45,087,520 bp
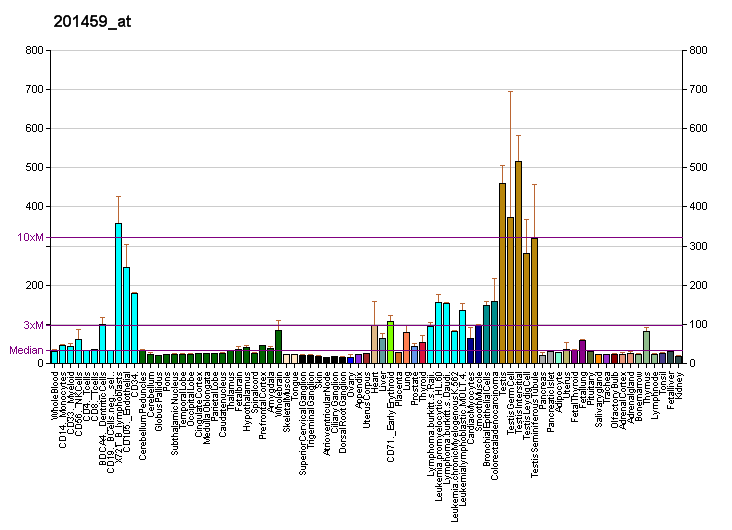
RNA expression pattern
Bgee	Human / Mouse (ortholog); Top expressed in: left testis; right testis; bronchial epithelial cell; right uterine tube; olfactory zone of nasal mucosa; mucosa of paranasal sinus; ventricular zone; parotid gland; tendon of biceps brachii; embryo / Top expressed in: epiblast; somite; tail of embryo; embryo; mandibular prominence; embryo; primitive streak; maxillary prominence; morula; ventricular zone; More reference expression data
BioGPS	More reference expression data
Gene ontology
Molecular function	RNA polymerase II cis-regulatory region sequence-specific DNA binding; nucleotide binding; 5'-3' DNA helicase activity; helicase activity; unfolded protein binding; DNA helicase activity; ATPase activity; protein binding; identical protein binding; chromatin DNA binding; ATP binding; hydrolase activity; RNA polymerase II core promoter sequence-specific DNA binding; TFIID-class transcription factor complex binding; protein homodimerization activity; ADP binding; ATPase binding
Cellular component	membrane; nuclear matrix; NuA4 histone acetyltransferase complex; intracellular anatomical structure; nucleoplasm; MLL1 complex; extracellular exosome; nucleus; Swr1 complex; R2TP complex; cytoplasm; centrosome; cytosol; Ino80 complex
Biological process	chromatin remodeling; DNA recombination; regulation of transcription, DNA-templated; cellular response to UV; histone H2A acetylation; cellular response to estradiol stimulus; transcription, DNA-templated; positive regulation of histone acetylation; cellular response to DNA damage stimulus; establishment of protein localization to chromatin; protein folding; positive regulation of telomerase RNA localization to Cajal body; histone H4 acetylation; regulation of growth; DNA repair; positive regulation of transcription by RNA polymerase II; DNA duplex unwinding; box C/D snoRNP assembly
Sources:Amigo / QuickGO
Orthologs
Databases	NCBI: entry; OMA: entry
Species	Human	Mouse
Entrez	10856	20174
Ensembl	ENSG00000183207	ENSMUSG00000003868
UniProt	Q9Y230	Q9WTM5
RefSeq (mRNA)	NM_006666; NM_001321190; NM_001321191	NM_011304
RefSeq (protein)	NP_001308119; NP_001308120; NP_006657	NP_035434
Location (UCSC)	Chr 19: 48.99 – 49.02 Mb	Chr 7: 45.07 – 45.09 Mb
PubMed search
- Wikidata
View/Edit Human	View/Edit Mouse

RuvB-like 2 (E. coli), also known as RUVBL2, is a human gene coding for a protein belonging to the AAA+ family of proteins.

== Function ==
This gene encodes the second human homologue of the bacterial RuvB gene. Bacterial RuvB protein is a DNA helicase essential for homologous recombination and DNA double-strand break repair. However, the evidence for whether RUVBL2 has DNA helicase activity is contradictory. This gene is physically linked to the CGB/LHB gene cluster on chromosome 19q13.3, and is very close (55 nt) to the LHB gene, in the opposite orientation.

== Interactions ==
RUVBL2 has been shown to interact with RuvB-like 1 and Activating transcription factor 2.
