= RuvB-like 1 =

Protein-coding gene in humans

RUVBL1
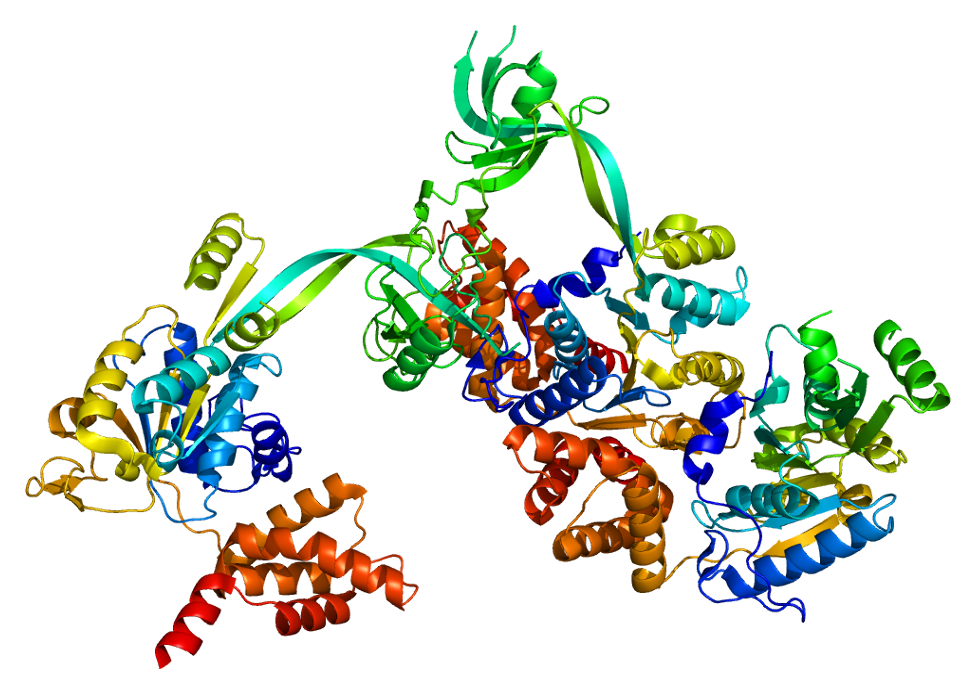

Identifiers
- Aliases: RUVBL1, ECP54, INO80H, NMP238, PONTIN, Pontin52, RVB1, TIH1, TIP49, TIP49A, ECP-54, NMP 238, RuvB like AAA ATPase 1
- External IDs: OMIM: 603449; MGI: 1928760; GeneCards: RUVBL1
Available structures
PDB	Ortholog search: PDBe RCSB
PDB	List of PDB id codes 2C9O, 2XSZ
Enzyme activity
EC #	BRENDA	ExPASy	KEGG	MetaCyc
3.6.4.12	↗	↗	↗	↗

Gene location (Human)
Chr.	Chromosome 3 (human)
Band	3q21.3	Start	128,064,778 bp
Band	3q21.3	End	128,153,914 bp

Gene location (Mouse)
Chr.	Chromosome 6 (mouse)
Band	6|6 D1	Start	88,442,391 bp
Band	6|6 D1	End	88,474,554 bp
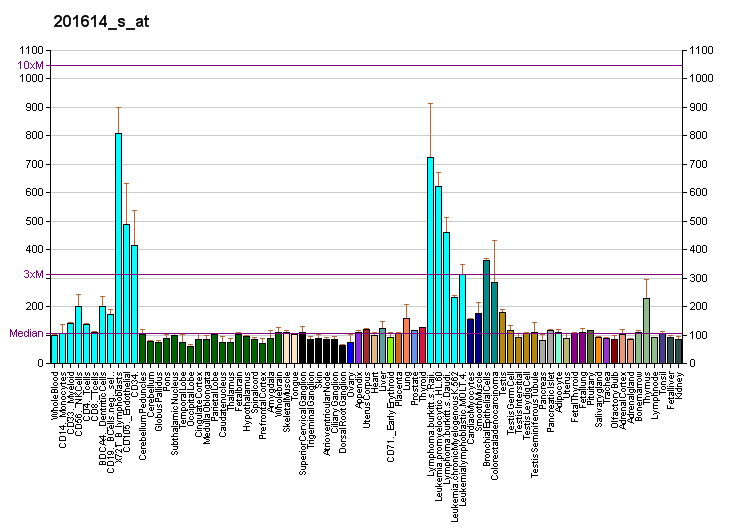
RNA expression pattern
Bgee	Human / Mouse (ortholog); Top expressed in: right uterine tube; ventricular zone; gonad; olfactory zone of nasal mucosa; ganglionic eminence; islet of Langerhans; stromal cell of endometrium; right testis; left testis; placenta / Top expressed in: epiblast; tail of embryo; embryo; embryo; lens; ventricular zone; neural tube; ganglionic eminence; yolk sac; blastocyst; More reference expression data
BioGPS	More reference expression data
Gene ontology
Molecular function	nucleotide binding; 5'-3' DNA helicase activity; helicase activity; DNA helicase activity; ATPase activity; protein binding; hydrolase activity; ATP binding; cadherin binding; TFIID-class transcription factor complex binding; ADP binding; ATPase binding
Cellular component	membrane; nuclear matrix; NuA4 histone acetyltransferase complex; nucleoplasm; microtubule organizing center; MLL1 complex; extracellular exosome; cytoskeleton; nucleus; Swr1 complex; R2TP complex; cytoplasm; cytosol; Ino80 complex
Biological process	DNA recombination; regulation of transcription, DNA-templated; positive regulation of protein targeting to mitochondrion; histone H2A acetylation; regulation of transcription by RNA polymerase II; CENP-A containing chromatin assembly; transcription, DNA-templated; cellular response to DNA damage stimulus; cell division; regulation of autophagy of mitochondrion; spermatogenesis; positive regulation of telomerase RNA localization to Cajal body; histone H4 acetylation; cell cycle; regulation of growth; beta-catenin-TCF complex assembly; DNA duplex unwinding; protein deubiquitination; DNA repair; box C/D snoRNP assembly; chromatin remodeling
Sources:Amigo / QuickGO
Orthologs
Databases	NCBI: entry; OMA: entry
Species	Human	Mouse
Entrez	8607	56505
Ensembl	ENSG00000175792; ENSG00000284901	ENSMUSG00000030079
UniProt	Q9Y265	P60122
RefSeq (mRNA)	NM_003707; NM_001319084; NM_001319086	NM_019685
RefSeq (protein)	NP_001306013; NP_001306015; NP_003698	NP_062659
Location (UCSC)	Chr 3: 128.06 – 128.15 Mb	Chr 6: 88.44 – 88.47 Mb
PubMed search
- Wikidata
View/Edit Human	View/Edit Mouse

RuvB-like 1 (E. coli), also known as RUVBL1 and TIP49, is a human gene. RUVBL1 can form a hexamer. The hexamer can form a dodecamer with RUVBL2 protein. Possesses single-stranded DNA-stimulated ATPase and ATP-dependent DNA helicase (3' to 5') activity; hexamerization is thought to be critical for ATP hydrolysis and adjacent subunits in the ring-like structure contribute to the ATPase activity.

== Interactions ==
RuvB-like 1 has been shown to interact with:

- ACTL6A,
- Beta-catenin,
- EP400,
- Myc, and
- RUVBL2.
