= HIstome =

Content
- Description: Histone proteins and histone modifying enzymes.
- Organisms: Homo sapiens

Contact
- Research center: Indian Institute of Science Education and Research, Pune
- Laboratory: Cancer Research Institute, Advanced Centre for Treatment
- Authors: Satyajeet P Khare, Farhat A Habib
- Primary citation: Khare, S, Habib, F, et al. (2012)
- Release date: 2011

Access
- Website: http://www.iiserpune.ac.in/~coee/histome/

HIstome is a database that provides information about human histone proteins, their sites of modifications, variants and modifying enzymes, and diseases linked to histone modifications.

== Update ==
HISTome2 is an updated version of the HIstome database released in 2020.

== See also ==
- Histone
