= CHD8 =

Protein-coding gene in humans

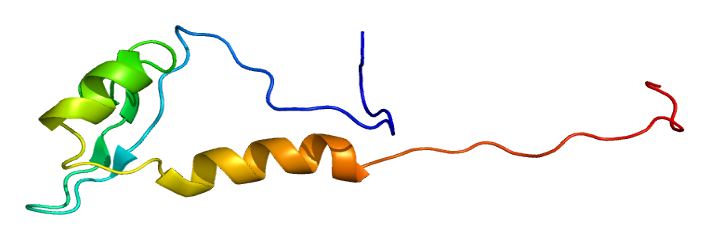

Identifiers
- Aliases: CHD8, AUTS18, HELSNF1, chromodomain helicase DNA binding protein 8, IDDAM
- External IDs: OMIM: 610528; MGI: 1915022; GeneCards: CHD8
Available structures
PDB	Ortholog search: PDBe RCSB
PDB	List of PDB id codes 2CKA, 2DL6

Gene location (Human)
Chr.	Chromosome 14 (human)
Band	14q11.2	Start	21,385,194 bp
Band	14q11.2	End	21,456,126 bp

Gene location (Mouse)
Chr.	Chromosome 14 (mouse)
Band	14|14 C2	Start	52,435,608 bp
Band	14|14 C2	End	52,495,237 bp
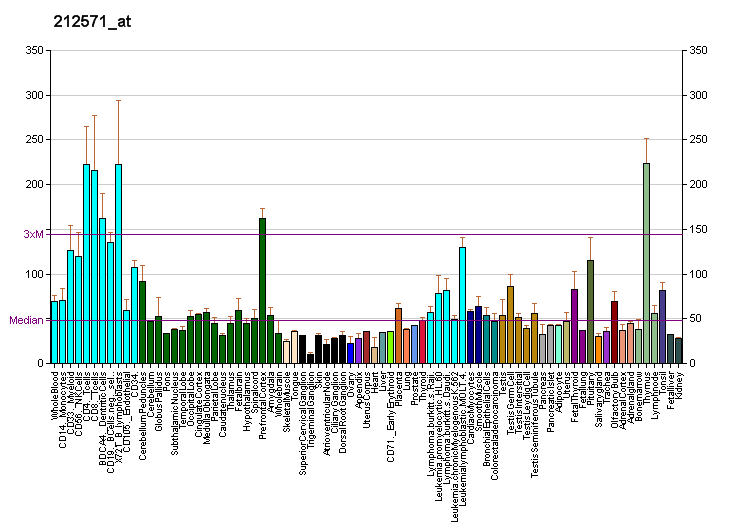
RNA expression pattern
Bgee	Human / Mouse (ortholog); Top expressed in: sural nerve; ventricular zone; right hemisphere of cerebellum; granulocyte; ganglionic eminence; skin of leg; skin of abdomen; epithelium of colon; anterior pituitary; spleen / Top expressed in: tail of embryo; genital tubercle; Rostral migratory stream; zygote; internal carotid artery; ventricular zone; secondary oocyte; external carotid artery; fossa; Ileal epithelium; More reference expression data
BioGPS	More reference expression data
Gene ontology
Molecular function	DNA binding; nucleotide binding; ATP-dependent activity, acting on DNA; helicase activity; chromatin binding; methylated histone binding; hydrolase activity, acting on acid anhydrides; DNA helicase activity; protein binding; hydrolase activity; ATP binding; p53 binding; beta-catenin binding; histone binding; armadillo repeat domain binding
Cellular component	nucleoplasm; MLL1 complex; nucleus; protein-containing complex
Biological process	regulation of transcription, DNA-templated; negative regulation of transcription by RNA polymerase II; Wnt signaling pathway; transcription, DNA-templated; positive regulation of transcription, DNA-templated; brain development; digestive tract development; positive regulation of transcription by RNA polymerase III; negative regulation of canonical Wnt signaling pathway; positive regulation of transcription by RNA polymerase II; DNA duplex unwinding; chromatin organization; negative regulation of Wnt signaling pathway; negative regulation of transcription, DNA-templated; canonical Wnt signaling pathway; negative regulation of apoptotic process; in utero embryonic development; startle response; social behavior; prepulse inhibition; negative regulation of fibroblast apoptotic process
Sources:Amigo / QuickGO
Orthologs
Databases	NCBI: entry; OMA: entry
Species	Human	Mouse
Entrez	57680	67772
Ensembl	ENSG00000100888	ENSMUSG00000053754
UniProt	Q9HCK8	Q09XV5
RefSeq (mRNA)	NM_020920; NM_001170629	NM_001010928; NM_201637
RefSeq (protein)	NP_001164100; NP_065971	NP_963999
Location (UCSC)	Chr 14: 21.39 – 21.46 Mb	Chr 14: 52.44 – 52.5 Mb
PubMed search
- Wikidata
View/Edit Human	View/Edit Mouse

Chromodomain-helicase-DNA-binding protein 8 is an enzyme that in humans is encoded by the CHD8 gene.

== Function ==
The gene CHD8 encodes the protein chromodomain helicase DNA binding protein 8, which is a chromatin regulator enzyme that is essential during fetal development. CHD8 is an ATP dependent enzyme.

The protein contains an Snf2 helicase domain that is responsible for the hydrolysis of ATP to ADP. CHD8 encodes for a DNA helicase that function as a transcription repressor by remodeling chromatin structure by altering the position of nucleosomes. CHD8 negatively regulates Wnt signaling. Wnt signaling is important in the vertebrate early development and morphogenesis. It is believed that CHD8 also recruits the linker histone H1 and causes the repression of β-catenin and p53 target genes. The importance of CHD8 can be observed in studies where CHD8-knockout mice died after 5.5 embryonic days because of widespread p53 induced apoptosis.

Recently CD8 has been associated to the regulation of long non-coding RNAs (lncRNAs), and the regulation of X chromosome inactivation (XCI) initiation, via regulation of Xist long non-coding RNA, the master regulator of XCI, though competitive binding to Xist regulatory regions.

== Clinical significance ==
Mutations in this gene have been linked to a subset of autism cases in human and mouse models.

Mutations in CHD8 could lead to upregulation of β-catenin-regulated genes; in some part of the brain this upregulation can cause brain overgrowth also known as macrocephaly.

Some studies have determined the role of CHD8 in autism spectrum disorder (ASD). CHD8 expression significantly increases during human mid-fetal development. The chromatin remodeling activity and its interaction with transcriptional regulators have shown to play an important role in ASD aetiology. The developing mammalian brain has a conserved CHD8 target regions that are associated with ASD risk genes. The knockdown of CHD8 in human neural stem cells results in dysregulation of ASD risk genes that are targeted by CHD8.
