= SANT domain =

Identifiers
- Symbol: SANT
- InterPro: IPR017884
- PROSITE: PS51293
- CATH: 1fex
- SCOP2: 1fex / SCOPe / SUPFAM

In molecular biology, a SANT domain is a protein domain that allows many chromatin remodeling proteins to interact with histones. The name SANT is an acronym standing for "Swi3, Ada2, N-Cor, and TFIIIB". It is part of the extended SANT/Myb family.
