= Chromatin remodeling =

Form of dynamic modification

Chromatin remodeling is the dynamic modification of chromatin architecture to allow access of condensed genomic DNA to the regulatory transcription machinery proteins, and thereby control gene expression. Such remodeling is mainly carried out by 1) covalent histone modifications by specific enzymes, e.g., histone acetyltransferases (HATs), histone deacetylases (HDACs), methyltransferases, and kinases, and 2) ATP-dependent chromatin remodeling complexes which either move, eject or restructure nucleosomes. Besides actively regulating gene expression, dynamic remodeling of chromatin imparts an epigenetic regulatory role in several key biological processes, egg cells DNA replication and repair; apoptosis; chromosome segregation as well as development and pluripotency. Aberrations in chromatin remodeling proteins are found to be associated with human diseases, including cancer. Targeting chromatin remodeling pathways is currently evolving as a major therapeutic strategy in the treatment of several cancers.

== Overview ==
Chromatin organization: The basic unit of chromatin organization is the nucleosome, which comprises 147 base pairs (bp) of DNA wrapped around a core of histone proteins. The level of nucleosomal packaging can have profound consequences on all DNA-mediated processes including gene regulation. Euchromatin (loose or open chromatin) structure is permissible for transcription whereas heterochromatin (tight or closed chromatin) is more compact and refractory to factors that need to gain access to the DNA template. Nucleosome positioning and chromatin compaction can be influenced by a wide range of processes including modification to both histones and DNA and ATP-dependent chromatin remodeling complexes.

The transcriptional regulation of the genome is controlled primarily at the preinitiation stage by binding of the core transcriptional machinery proteins (namely, RNA polymerase, transcription factors, activators and repressors) to the core promoter sequence on the coding region of the DNA. However, DNA is tightly packaged in the nucleus with the help of packaging proteins, chiefly histone proteins to form repeating units of nucleosomes which further bundle together to form condensed chromatin structure. Such condensed structure occludes many DNA regulatory regions, not allowing them to interact with transcriptional machinery proteins and regulate gene expression. To overcome this issue and allow dynamic access to condensed DNA, a process known as chromatin remodeling alters nucleosome architecture to expose or hide regions of DNA for transcriptional regulation.

By definition, chromatin remodeling is the enzyme-assisted process to facilitate access of nucleosomal DNA by remodeling the structure, composition and positioning of nucleosomes.

== Classification ==
Access to nucleosomal DNA is governed by two major classes of protein complexes:

1. Covalent histone-modifying complexes.
2. ATP-dependent chromatin remodeling complexes.

=== Covalent histone-modifying complexes ===
Specific protein complexes, known as histone-modifying complexes catalyze addition or removal of various chemical elements on histones. These enzymatic modifications include acetylation, methylation, phosphorylation, ubiquitination, and citrullination and primarily occur at N-terminal histone tails. Such modifications affect the binding affinity between histones and DNA, and thus loosening or tightening the condensed DNA wrapped around histones, e.g., methylation of specific lysine residues in H3 and H4 causes further condensation of DNA around histones, and thereby prevents binding of transcription factors (TF) to the DNA that lead to gene repression. On the contrary, histone acetylation relaxes chromatin condensation and exposes DNA for TF binding, leading to increased gene expression.

==== Known modifications ====
Well characterized modifications to histones include:

- Methylation

Both lysine and arginine residues are known to be methylated. Methylated lysines are the best understood marks of the histone code, as specific methylated lysine match well with gene expression states. Methylation of lysines H3K4 and H3K36 is correlated with transcriptional activation while demethylation of H3K4 is correlated with silencing of the genomic region. Methylation of lysines H3K9 and H3K27 is correlated with transcriptional repression. Particularly, H3K9me3 is highly correlated with constitutive heterochromatin.

- Acetylation - by HAT (histone acetyl transferase); deacetylation - by HDAC (histone deacetylase)

Acetylation tends to define the 'openness' of chromatin as acetylated histones cannot pack as well together as deacetylated histones.

- Phosphorylation
- Ubiquitination
- Citrullination

However, there are many more histone modifications, and sensitive mass spectrometry approaches have recently greatly expanded the catalog.

==== Histone code hypothesis ====
The histone code is a hypothesis that the transcription of genetic information encoded in DNA is in part regulated by chemical modifications to histone proteins, primarily on their unstructured ends. Together with similar modifications such as DNA methylation it is part of the epigenetic code.

Cumulative evidence suggests that such code is written by specific enzymes which can (for example) methylate or acetylate histones ('writers'), removed by other enzymes having demethylase or deacetylase activity ('erasers'), and finally readily identified by proteins ('readers') that are recruited to such histone modifications and bind via specific domains, e.g., bromodomain, chromodomain. These triple action of 'writing', 'reading' and 'erasing' establish the favorable local environment for transcriptional regulation, DNA-damage repair, etc.

The critical concept of the histone code hypothesis is that the histone modifications serve to recruit other proteins by specific recognition of the modified histone via protein domains specialized for such purposes, rather than through simply stabilizing or destabilizing the interaction between histone and the underlying DNA. These recruited proteins then act to alter chromatin structure actively or to promote transcription.

A very basic summary of the histone code for gene expression status is given below (histone nomenclature is described here):

| Type of modification | Histone | | | | | | |
| Type of modification | H3K4 | H3K9 | H3K14 | H3K27 | H3K79 | H4K20 | H2BK5 |
|---|---|---|---|---|---|---|---|
| mono-methylation | activation | activation | | activation | activation | activation | activation |
| di-methylation | | repression | | repression | activation | | |
| tri-methylation | activation | repression | | repression | activation, repression | | repression |
| acetylation | | activation | activation | | | | |

=== ATP-dependent chromatin remodeling ===
ATP-dependent chromatin-remodeling complexes regulate gene expression by either moving, ejecting or restructuring nucleosomes. These protein complexes have a common ATPase domain and energy from the hydrolysis of ATP allows these remodeling complexes to reposition nucleosomes (often referred to as "nucleosome sliding") along the DNA, eject or assemble histones on/off of DNA or facilitate exchange of histone variants, and thus creating nucleosome-free regions of DNA for gene activation. Also, several remodelers have DNA-translocation activity to carry out specific remodeling tasks.

All ATP-dependent chromatin-remodeling complexes possess a sub unit of ATPase that belongs to the SNF2 superfamily of proteins. In association to the sub unit's identity, two main groups have been classified for these proteins. These are known as the SWI2/SNF2 group and the imitation SWI (ISWI) group. The third class of ATP-dependent complexes that has been recently described contains a Snf2-like ATPase and also demonstrates deacetylase activity.

==== Known chromatin remodeling complexes ====
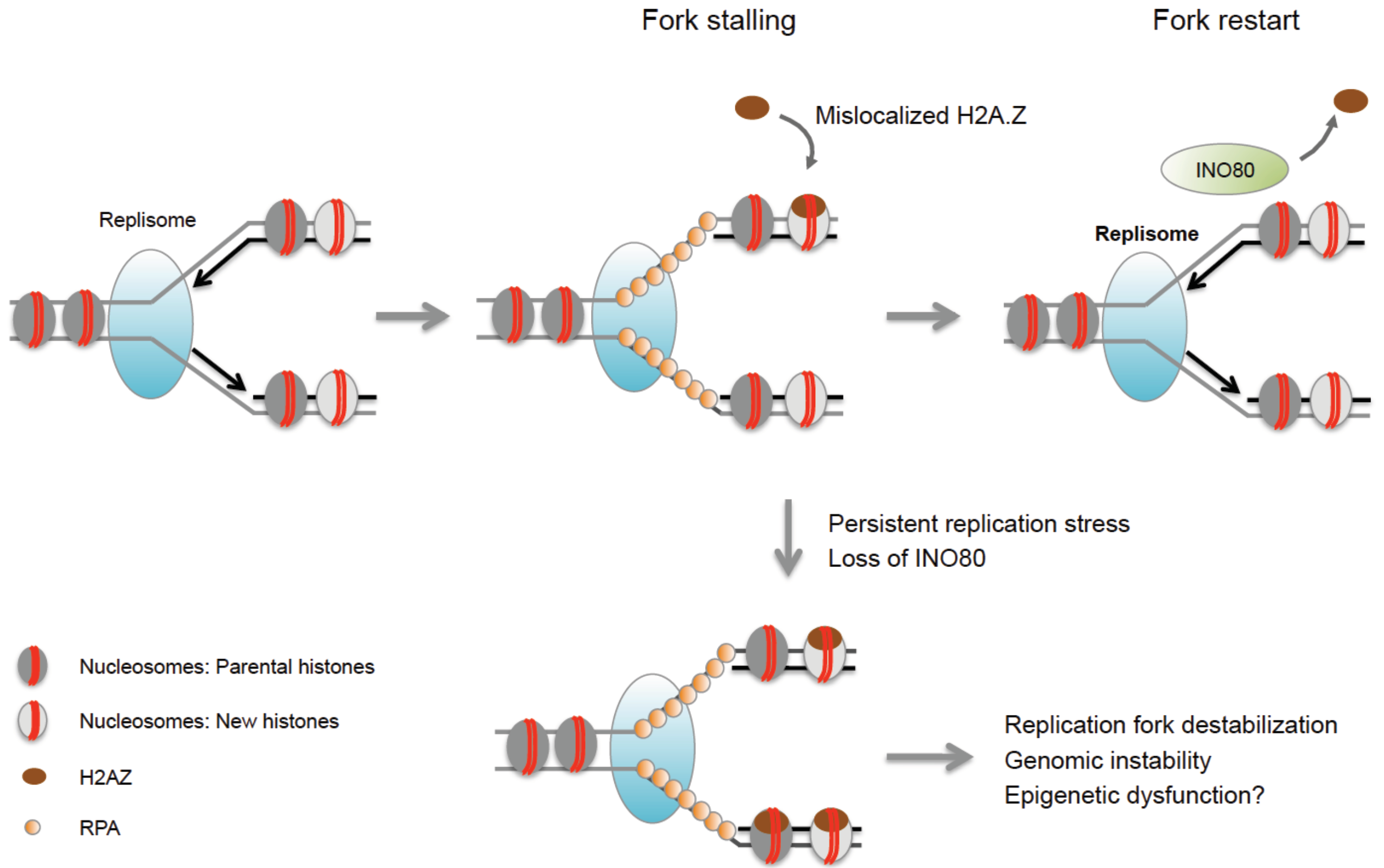
INO80 stabilizes replication forks and counteracts mislocalization of H2A.Z

There are at least four families of chromatin remodelers in eukaryotes: SWI/SNF, ISWI, NuRD/Mi-2/CHD, and INO80 with first two remodelers being very well studied so far, especially in the yeast model. Although all of remodelers share common ATPase domain, their functions are specific based on several biological processes (DNA repair, apoptosis, etc.). This is due to the fact that each remodeler complex has unique protein domains (Helicase, bromodomain, etc.) in their catalytic ATPase region and also has different recruited subunits.

==== Specific functions ====
- Several in-vitro experiments suggest that ISWI remodelers organize nucleosome into proper bundle form and create equal spacing between nucleosomes, whereas SWI/SNF remodelers disorder nucleosomes.
- The ISWI-family remodelers have been shown to play central roles in chromatin assembly after DNA replication and maintenance of higher-order chromatin structures.
- INO80 and SWI/SNF-family remodelers participate in DNA double-strand break (DSB) repair and nucleotide-excision repair (NER) and thereby plays crucial role in TP53 mediated DNA-damage response.
- NuRD/Mi-2/CHD remodeling complexes primarily mediate transcriptional repression in the nucleus and are required for the maintenance of pluripotency of embryonic stem cells.

== Significance ==
Chromatin remodeling complexes in the dynamic regulation of transcription: In the presence of acetylated histones (HAT mediated) and absence of methylase (HMT) activity, chromatin is loosely packaged. Additional nucleosome repositioning by chromatin remodeler complex, SWI/SNF opens up DNA region where transcription machinery proteins, like RNA Pol II, transcription factors and co-activators bind to turn on gene transcription. In the absence of SWI/SNF, nucleosomes can not move farther and remain tightly aligned to one another. Additional methylation by HMT and deacetylation by HDAC proteins condenses DNA around histones and thus, make DNA unavailable for binding by RNA Pol II and other activators, leading to gene silencing.

=== In normal biological processes ===
Chromatin remodeling plays a central role in the regulation of gene expression by providing the transcription machinery with dynamic access to an otherwise tightly packaged genome. Further, nucleosome movement by chromatin remodelers is essential to several important biological processes, including chromosome assembly and segregation, DNA replication and repair, embryonic development and pluripotency, and cell-cycle progression. Deregulation of chromatin remodeling causes loss of transcriptional regulation at these critical check-points required for proper cellular functions, and thus causes various disease syndromes, including cancer.

=== Response to DNA damage ===
Chromatin relaxation is one of the earliest cellular responses to DNA damage. Several experiments have been performed on the recruitment kinetics of proteins involved in the response to DNA damage. The relaxation appears to be initiated by PARP1, whose accumulation at DNA damage is half complete by 1.6 seconds after DNA damage occurs. This is quickly followed by accumulation of chromatin remodeler Alc1, which has an ADP-ribose–binding domain, allowing it to be quickly attracted to the product of PARP1. The maximum recruitment of Alc1 occurs within 10 seconds of DNA damage. About half of the maximum chromatin relaxation, presumably due to action of Alc1, occurs by 10 seconds. PARP1 action at the site of a double-strand break allows recruitment of the two DNA repair enzymes MRE11 and NBS1. Half maximum recruitment of these two DNA repair enzymes takes 13 seconds for MRE11 and 28 seconds for NBS1.

Another process of chromatin relaxation, after formation of a DNA double-strand break, employs γH2AX, the phosphorylated form of the H2AX protein. The histone variant H2AX constitutes about 10% of the H2A histones in human chromatin. γH2AX (phosphorylated on serine 139 of H2AX) was detected at 20 seconds after irradiation of cells (with DNA double-strand break formation), and half maximum accumulation of γH2AX occurred in one minute. The extent of chromatin with phosphorylated γH2AX is about two million base pairs at the site of a DNA double-strand break.

γH2AX does not, by itself, cause chromatin decondensation, but within seconds of irradiation the protein "Mediator of the DNA damage checkpoint 1" (MDC1) specifically attaches to γH2AX. This is accompanied by simultaneous accumulation of RNF8 protein and the DNA repair protein NBS1 which bind to MDC1 as MDC1 attaches to γH2AX. RNF8 mediates extensive chromatin decondensation, through its subsequent interaction with CHD4 protein, a component of the nucleosome remodeling and deacetylase complex NuRD. CHD4 accumulation at the site of the double-strand break is rapid, with half-maximum accumulation occurring by 40 seconds after irradiation.

The fast initial chromatin relaxation upon DNA damage (with rapid initiation of DNA repair) is followed by a slow recondensation, with chromatin recovering a compaction state close to its pre-damage level in ~ 20 min.

=== Cancer ===
Chromatin remodeling provides fine-tuning at crucial cell growth and division steps, like cell-cycle progression, DNA repair and chromosome segregation, and therefore exerts tumor-suppressor function. Mutations in such chromatin remodelers and deregulated covalent histone modifications potentially favor self-sufficiency in cell growth and escape from growth-regulatory cell signals - two important hallmarks of cancer.

- Inactivating mutations in SMARCB1, formerly known as hSNF5/INI1 and a component of the human SWI/SNF remodeling complex have been found in large number of rhabdoid tumors, commonly affecting pediatric population. Similar mutations are also present in other childhood cancers, such as choroid plexus carcinoma, medulloblastoma and in some acute leukemias. Further, mouse knock-out studies strongly support SMARCB1 as a tumor suppressor protein. Since the original observation of SMARCB1 mutations in rhabdoid tumors, several more subunits of the human SWI/SNF chromatin remodeling complex have been found mutated in a wide range of neoplasms.
- The SWI/SNF ATPase BRG1 (or SMARCA4) is the most frequently mutated chromatin remodeling ATPase in cancer. Mutations in this gene were first recognized in human cancer cell lines derived from lung. In cancer, mutations in BRG1 show an unusually high preference for missense mutations that target the ATPase domain. Mutations are enriched at highly conserved ATPase sequences, which lie on important functional surfaces such as the ATP pocket or DNA-binding surface. These mutations act in a genetically dominant manner to alter chromatin regulatory function at enhancers and promoters.
- Inactivating mutations in BCL7A in Diffuse large B-cell lymphoma (DLBCL) and in other haematological malignancies
- PML-RARA fusion protein in acute myeloid leukemia recruits histone deacetylases. This leads to repression of genes responsible for myelocytes to differentiate, leading to leukemia.
- Tumor suppressor Rb protein functions by the recruitment of the human homologs of the SWI/SNF enzymes BRG1, histone deacetylase and DNA methyltransferase. Mutations in BRG1 are reported in several cancers causing loss of tumor suppressor action of Rb.
- Recent reports indicate DNA hypermethylation in the promoter region of major tumor suppressor genes in several cancers. Although few mutations are reported in histone methyltransferases yet, correlation of DNA hypermethylation and histone H3 lysine-9 methylation has been reported in several cancers, mainly in colorectal and breast cancers.
- Mutations in histone acetyltransferase (HAT) p300 (missense and truncating type) are most commonly reported in colorectal, pancreatic, breast and gastric carcinomas. Loss of heterozygosity in coding region of p300 (chromosome 22q13) is present in large number of glioblastomas.
- Further, HATs have diverse role as transcription factors beside having histone acetylase activity, e.g., HAT subunit, hADA3 may act as an adaptor protein linking transcription factors with other HAT complexes. In the absence of hADA3, TP53 transcriptional activity is significantly reduced, suggesting role of hADA3 in activating TP53 function in response to DNA damage.
- Similarly, TRRAP, the human homolog to yeast Tra1, has been shown to directly interact with c-Myc and E2F1, known oncoproteins.

==== Cancer genomics ====
Rapid advance in cancer genomics and high-throughput ChIP-chip, ChIP-Seq and Bisulfite sequencing methods are providing more insight into role of chromatin remodeling in transcriptional regulation and role in cancer.

==== Therapeutic intervention ====
Epigenetic instability caused by deregulation in chromatin remodeling is studied in several cancers, including breast cancer, colorectal cancer and pancreatic cancer. Such instability largely causes widespread silencing of genes with primary impact on tumor-suppressor genes. Hence, strategies are now being tried to overcome epigenetic silencing with synergistic combination of HDAC inhibitors (HDI) and DNA-demethylating agents. HDIs are primarily used as adjunct therapy in several cancer types. HDAC inhibitors can induce p21 (WAF1) expression, a regulator of p53's tumor suppressoractivity. HDACs are involved in the pathway by which the retinoblastoma protein (pRb) suppresses cell proliferation. Estrogen is well-established as a mitogenic factor implicated in the tumorigenesis and progression of breast cancer via its binding to the estrogen receptor alpha (ERα). Recent data indicate that chromatin inactivation mediated by HDAC and DNA methylation is a critical component of ERα silencing in human breast cancer cells.

- Approved usage:
  - Vorinostat was licensed by the U.S. FDA in October 2006 for the treatment of cutaneous T cell lymphoma (CTCL).
  - Romidepsin (trade name Istodax) was licensed by the US FDA in Nov 2009 for cutaneous T-cell lymphoma (CTCL).
- Phase III Clinical trials:
  - Panobinostat (LBH589) is in clinical trials for various cancers including a phase III trial for cutaneous T cell lymphoma (CTCL).
  - Valproic acid (as Mg valproate) in phase III trials for cervical cancer and ovarian cancer.
- Started pivotal phase II clinical trials:
  - Belinostat (PXD101) has had a phase II trial for relapsed ovarian cancer, and reported good results for T cell lymphoma.
  - HDAC inhibitors.

Current front-runner candidates for new drug targets are Histone Lysine Methyltransferases (KMT) and Protein Arginine Methyltransferases (PRMT).

=== Other disease syndromes ===
- ATRX-syndrome (α-thalassemia X-linked mental retardation) and α-thalassemia myelodysplasia syndrome are caused by mutations in ATRX, a SNF2-related ATPase with a PHD finger domain.
- CHARGE syndrome, an autosomal dominant disorder, has been linked recently to haploinsufficiency of CHD7, which encodes the CHD family ATPase CHD7.

=== Senescence ===
Chromatin architectural remodeling is implicated in the process of cellular senescence, which is related to, and yet distinct from, organismal aging. Replicative cellular senescence refers to a permanent cell cycle arrest where post-mitotic cells continue to exist as metabolically active cells but fail to proliferate. Senescence can arise due to age associated degradation, telomere attrition, progerias, pre-malignancies, and other forms of damage or disease. Senescent cells undergo distinct repressive phenotypic changes, potentially to prevent the proliferation of damaged or cancerous cells, with modified chromatin organization, fluctuations in remodeler abundance, and changes in epigenetic modifications. Senescent cells undergo chromatin landscape modifications as constitutive heterochromatin migrates to the center of the nucleus and displaces euchromatin and facultative heterochromatin to regions at the edge of the nucleus. This disrupts chromatin-lamin interactions and inverts of the pattern typically seen in a mitotically active cell. Individual Lamin-Associated Domains (LADs) and Topologically Associating Domains (TADs) are disrupted by this migration which can affect cis interactions across the genome. Additionally, there is a general pattern of canonical histone loss, particularly in terms of the nucleosome histones H3 and H4 and the linker histone H1. Histone variants with two exons are upregulated in senescent cells to produce modified nucleosome assembly which contributes to chromatin permissiveness to senescent changes. Although transcription of variant histone proteins may be elevated, canonical histone proteins are not expressed as they are only made during the S phase of the cell cycle and senescent cells are post-mitotic. During senescence, portions of chromosomes can be exported from the nucleus for lysosomal degradation which results in greater organizational disarray and disruption of chromatin interactions.

Chromatin remodeler abundance may be implicated in cellular senescence as knockdown or knockout of ATP-dependent remodelers such as NuRD, ACF1, and SWI/SNP can result in DNA damage and senescent phenotypes in yeast, C. elegans, mice, and human cell cultures. ACF1 and NuRD are downregulated in senescent cells which suggests that chromatin remodeling is essential for maintaining a mitotic phenotype. Genes involved in signaling for senescence can be silenced by chromatin confirmation and polycomb repressive complexes as seen in PRC1/PRC2 silencing of p16. Specific remodeler depletion results in activation of proliferative genes through a failure to maintain silencing. Some remodelers act on enhancer regions of genes rather than the specific loci to prevent re-entry into the cell cycle by forming regions of dense heterochromatin around regulatory regions.

Senescent cells undergo widespread fluctuations in epigenetic modifications in specific chromatin regions compared to mitotic cells. Human and murine cells undergoing replicative senescence experience a general global decrease in methylation; however, specific loci can differ from the general trend. Specific chromatin regions, especially those around the promoters or enhancers of proliferative loci, may exhibit elevated methylation states with an overall imbalance of repressive and activating histone modifications. Proliferative genes may show increases in the repressive mark H3K27me3 while genes involved in silencing or aberrant histone products may be enriched with the activating modification H3K4me3. Additionally, upregulating histone deacetylases, such as members of the sirtuin family, can delay senescence by removing acetyl groups that contribute to greater chromatin accessibility. General loss of methylation, combined with the addition of acetyl groups results in a more accessible chromatin conformation with a propensity towards disorganization when compared to mitotically active cells. General loss of histones precludes addition of histone modifications and contributes changes in enrichment in some chromatin regions during senescence.

== See also ==
- Epigenetics
- Histone
- Nucleosomes
- Chromatin
- Histone acetyltransferase
- Transcription factors
- CAF-1 (Chromatin assembly factor-1) - histone chaperone that execute a coordinating role in chromatin remodeling.
