= CCDC190 =

Protein found in humans

Identifiers
- Aliases: CCDC190, C1orf110, coiled-coil domain containing 190
- External IDs: MGI: 1925715; GeneCards: CCDC190

Gene location (Human)
Chr.	Chromosome 1 (human)
Band	1q23.3	Start	162,824,458 bp
Band	1q23.3	End	162,868,761 bp

Gene location (Mouse)
Chr.	Chromosome 1 (mouse)
Band	1|1 H3	Start	169,756,217 bp
Band	1|1 H3	End	169,762,222 bp
RNA expression pattern
Bgee	Human / Mouse (ortholog); Top expressed in: bronchial epithelial cell; olfactory zone of nasal mucosa; epithelium of nasopharynx; mucosa of paranasal sinus; gonad; right coronary artery; nasal epithelium; trachea; left coronary artery; thoracic aorta / Top expressed in: hypothalamus; striatum of neuraxis; dentate gyrus of hippocampal formation granule cell; hippocampus proper; cerebellum; cerebellar cortex; blastocyst; yolk sac; olfactory bulb; primary visual cortex; More reference expression data
BioGPS	n/a
Orthologs
Databases	NCBI: entry; OMA: entry
Species	Human	Mouse
Entrez	339512	78465
Ensembl	ENSG00000185860	ENSMUSG00000070532
UniProt	Q86UF4	Q3URK1
RefSeq (mRNA)	NM_178550; NM_001394065	NM_001033185; NM_001347138
RefSeq (protein)	NP_848645	NP_001028357; NP_001334067
Location (UCSC)	Chr 1: 162.82 – 162.87 Mb	Chr 1: 169.76 – 169.76 Mb
PubMed search
- Wikidata
View/Edit Human	View/Edit Mouse

Coiled-Coil Domain Containing 190, also known as C1orf110, the Chromosome 1 Open Reading Frame 110, MGC48998 and CCDC190, is found to be a protein coding gene widely expressed in vertebrates. RNA-seq gene expression profile shows that this gene selectively expressed in different organs of human body like lung brain and heart. The expression product of c1orf110 is often called Coiled-coil domain-containing protein 190 with a size of 302 aa. It may get the name because a coiled-coil domain is found from position 14 to 72. At least 6 spliced variants of its mRNA and 3 isoforms of this protein can be identified, which is caused by alternative splicing in human.

== Gene ==
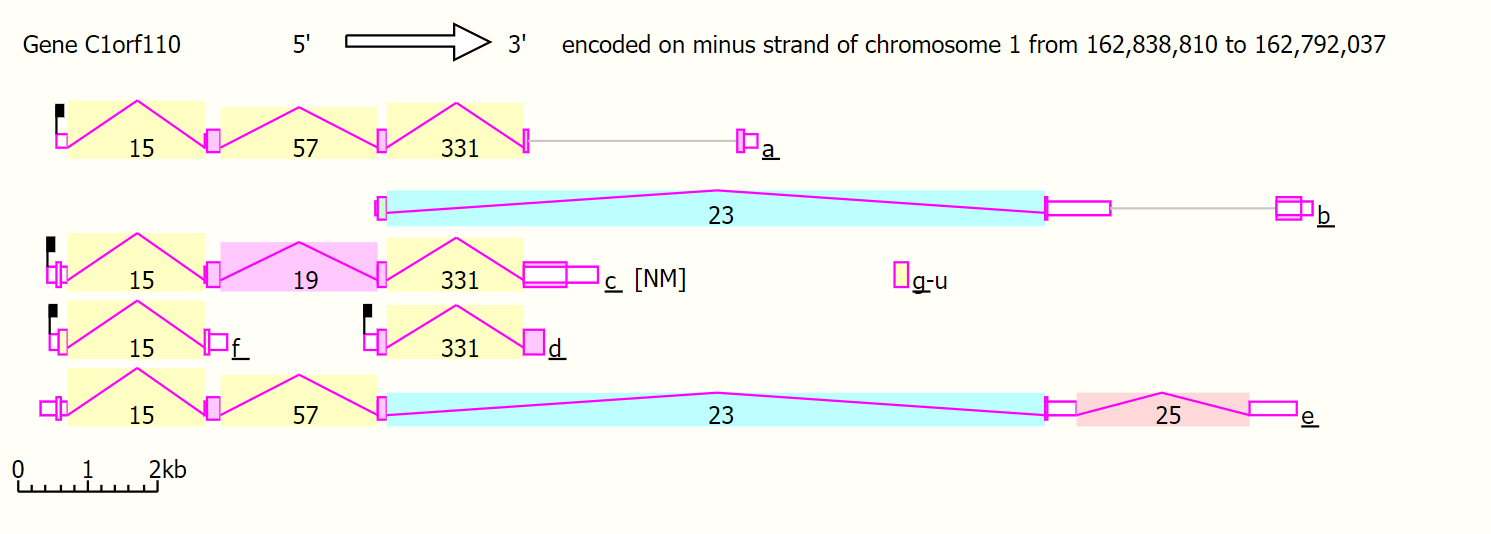
The mRNA variants for human ccdc190 gene. Numbers on the exon/intron show the frequency of splicing for each mRNA variants.

In human genome, it locates in c1q23.3 with a size of 44,461 bps from 162838810 to 162792037 on the reverse stand. The closest neighbors of ccdc190 gene are HSD17B7 and DDR2 gene in the long arm of chromosome 1. This gene can have 3 to 5 exons depend on the splicing pattern of mRNA. Some of its mRNA variants are shown in the left figure, it describes the alternative mRNAs aligned from 5' to 3', the region covered with different colors are the introns. Exons are located at both ends of the intron. Their lengths can be estimated from the calibrator shown at bottom left.

== Homology ==
Though some isoforms are found for ccdc190 protein in each species, no paralog can be identified for this gene. The orthologs of ccdc190 are determined using BLAST.

=== Orthologs ===
The E values for all the orthologs are from 0 to 8e-126, and the similarity is from 63.1% to 98.7% (excluding human sequence). The least related sequence is found from red fox (Vulpes vulpes). Then the homology of ccdc190 is also identified in HomoloGene database of NCBI and the least relative sequence is found from coelacanth (Latimeria chalumnae). Thus, this gene is found to be expressed in vertebrate like fish, amphibian, reptile and mammal, expression for ccdc190 in invertebrate is not identified.

=== Evolution ===
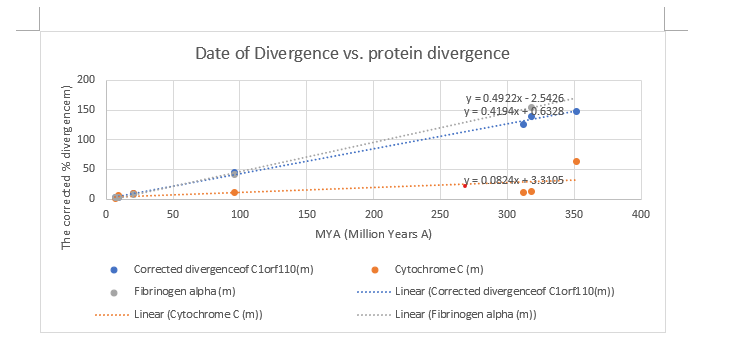
The graph showing the approximate date of divergence (from human) for a given species (MYA [million years ago]) versus the corrected % divergence (m) of that species' orthologous protein. The data and trendlines of cytochrome C and fibrinogen alpha chain are also included as indicators for proteins with low divergence and high divergence.

This gene first appeared in the elephant shark (Callorhinchus milii), which is 473 million years ago from now. While the gene family cannot be determined due to the lack of paralogs. The most distantly related organism is found to be coelacanth (Latimeria chalumnae) with a sequence identity of 24.8%. The number of alternative splicing variants in it can be hard to determine due to the lack of data. The divergence rate of ccdc190 is estimated based on comparison with two known protein: cytochrome C and fibrinogen alpha, which is shown in the left figure. As it can be found from the graph, the trendline of ccdc190 is closer to that of fibrinogen alpha, showing a relative high divergence and evolution rate.

== Proteins ==
Based on the result of BLAST of human ccdc190 protein sequence, two isoforms can be found with high similarity near 99.8%. Also, from the Protein database of NCBI it can be found that four isoforms of ccdc190 protein (isoform 1, isoform X1, isoform 2, isoform X3) which are derived from transcription variants.

The theoretical isoelectric point and molecular weight of human ccdc190 isoform 1 are 9.62 and 34kD. Also, based on the analysis of SAPS, this protein seems to have more lysine and glutamine compared to other proteins in human. The sum of arginine and lysine is also higher than normal, indicating a high amount of basic amino acid in this protein. This can be also validated by the fact that the difference of basic amino acid and acidic amino acid is higher in ccdc190.The repeats are identified at the start and middle of the protein sequence. While this protein has no significant charge segments as well as hydrophobic or transmembrane domains. The similar pattern can be identified in its close orthologs from gorilla and horse. In its distant orthologs, significant charge segments and transmembrane segments are still not identified, however, the composition of amino acid can be very different with that of human, as well as the repeats pattern. Most of the secondary structure are found to be helix from prediction tools, this pattern is conserved in the close orthologs and are different in the distant orthologs. The predicted tertiary structure is shown on the left figure, which shows that this protein may have a helix-loop-helix motif that has the capability to interact with the DNA double strand. suggesting a potential DNA binding function of ccdc190.

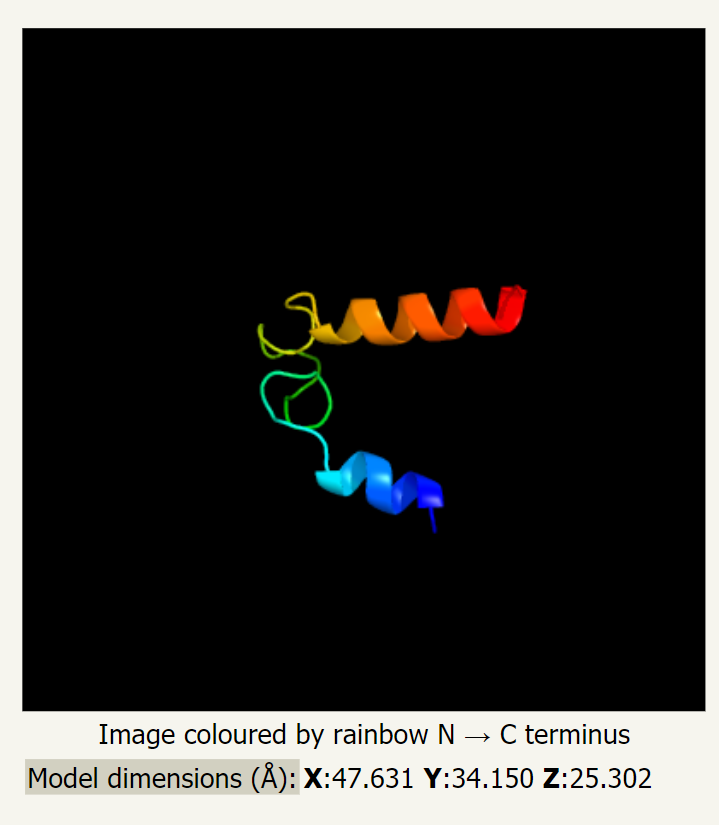
The predicted tertiary structure with the highest confidence of human ccdc190 based on the results of Phyre2. Two coiled-coil domains can be identified from the figure. Regions of red color have the highest confidence and region of blue has the lowest confidence.

== Regulation ==
=== Gene level ===
Five promoters are identified for human ccdc190 gene, and they contain many different transcription factors like nuclear factor kappa B/c-rel, human and murine ETS1 factors and Krueppel like transcription factors. In human body, this gene is found selected expressed in tissues like lung, brain and heart. Tissues like esophagus, trachea and stomach also have the highest expression. Generally, ccdc190 is identified to be highly expressed in tissues of human’s respiratory system, digestive system and reproductive system, and also found expressed in heart and brain.

=== Transcription level ===
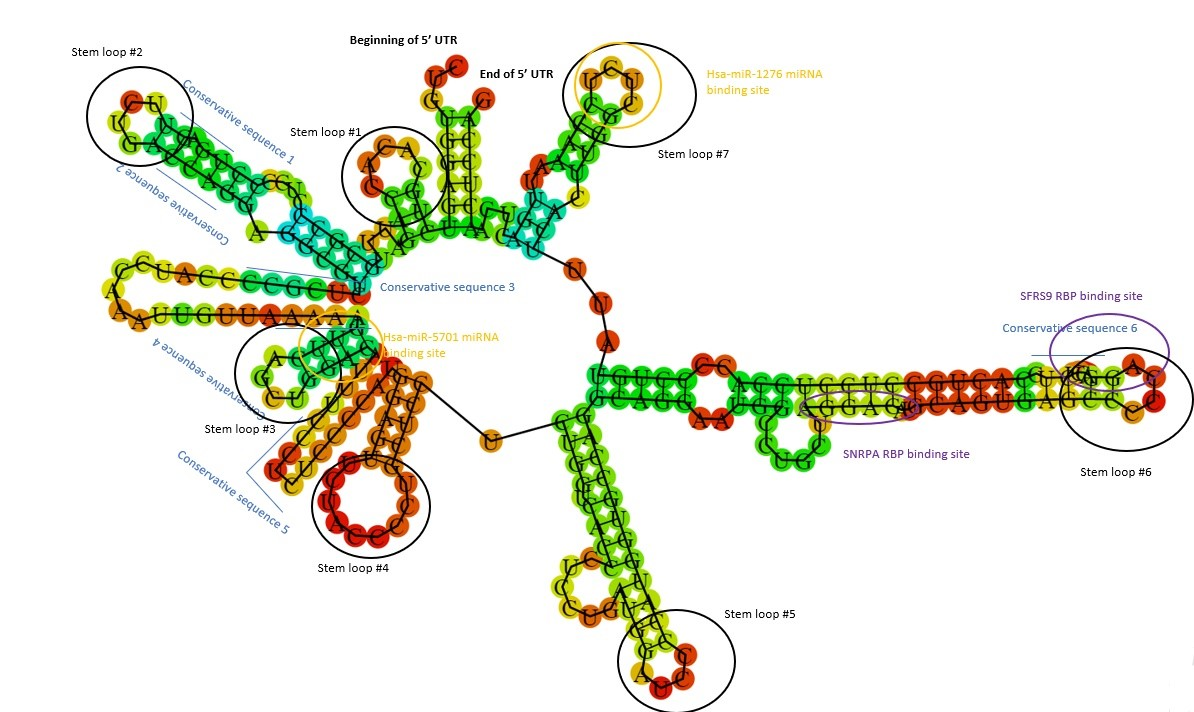
The RNA folding result of 5’ UTR regions of human based on RNAFold webset. The highly conserved regions are lined in the figure. These regions are important likely to represent conserved transcription factor binding sites. The RBP regions are identified based on information from RBPDB database, and miRNA binding sites are found from miRDB.

Some conserved regions are found in the 5' UTR and 3' UTR region of human ccdc190 mRNA based on multiple sequence alignment results, they can be potential RNA binding protein and miRNA binding regions.

=== Protein level ===
The protein level regulation for human ccdc190 includes the protein trafficking leading by signal peptide and post translation modification like sumoylation and acetylation. The potential sites for modification and signal peptide regions are labeled in the conceptual translation below and the localization of ccdc190 is discussed.

==== Protein localization ====
Based on the result of PSORT II, 52.2% of the ccdc190 protein is in the nuclear, 26.6% of it is located in mitochondria, 17.4% of the total amount is in cytoplasm and 4.3% are in the endoplasmic reticulum (ER). This result can be validated by that there are also predicted cleavage site for mitochondrial presequence for this protein, which makes sense due to nearly a quarter of the amount is in mitochondria. Also, nuclear localization signals were also identified with a NLS score of 0.13. The ER membrane retention signals are also identified in the N-terminus and C-terminus.

==== Conceptual translation ====
The conceptual translation of human ccdc190 gene is identified and labeled. In the figure below, amino acid regions for exon dividing sites, predicted domains, post translation modification sites and signal peptides are labelled. The conserved regions found by multiple sequence alignment are bolded. The legends of each label are either shown on the right or on the margin of translation.

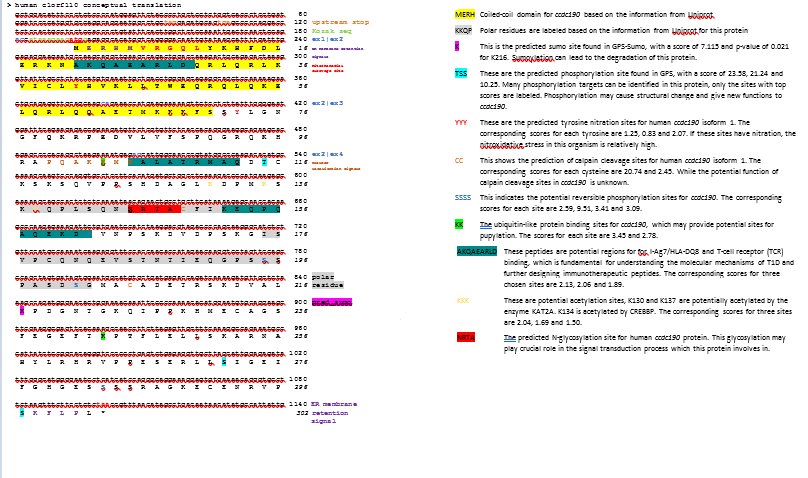

== Function ==
The human ccdc190 protein is predicted to have coiled-coil domain that may have multiple functions. First. the physical properties like length and flexibility of this domain make it function as a good molecular spacer. It is found that the length variation of coiled-coil domain is 3.6 times lower than that of other regions, and the length of amino acid is relatively conserved within different proteins, indicating that the physical size of this domain may play an important role in its function. Also, coiled-coil domain are found essential in accurate chromosome segregation. It is found that during cell division, some coiled-coil contain proteins like Ska1, Ska2, and Ska3 form a dimer and the mutation of the dimer leads to chromosome congression failure which can lead to cell death. Finally, there is evidence that this domain can play a role in DNA recognition and binding. In the restriction enzyme found inside Methanococcus jannaschii, subunits that encoding coiled-coil domain are found served as molecular ruler for the recognition of direct repeats in DNA sequence, similar pattern is found in the MerR family of transcriptional activators in bacteria.

== Interacting proteins ==
The potential interactants of ccdc190 is found and summarized in the following table:

Abbreviated name	Full name	Tools that reported the interaction	Basis of identification	Scores or statistical measures	Potential location	Brief function
APP	amyloid beta (A4) precursor protein	ELISA	BioGRID			Proteolysis of APP generates neurotoxic Aβ peptide which is crucial for development of Alzheimer's disease
NPM1	nucleophosmin	crosslinking mass spectrometry	BioGRID		Nucleus	Involved in diverse cellular processes such as ribosome biogenesis, centrosome duplication, protein chaperoning, histone assembly, cell proliferation, and regulation of tumor suppressors p53/TP53 and ARF.
PPIB	peptidylprolyl isomerase B	crosslinking mass spectrometry	BioGRID			PPIase that catalyzes the cis-trans isomerization of proline imidic peptide bonds in oligopeptides and may therefore assist protein folding.
PPP1R14C	protein phosphatase 1, regulatory (inhibitor) subunit 14C	crosslinking mass spectrometry	BioGRID			Inhibitor of the PP1 regulatory subunit PPP1CA.
PAQR6	Membrane progestin receptor delta	Textmining	STRING	0.721		May be involved in regulating rapid P4 signaling in the nervous system. Also binds dehydroepiandrosterone (DHEA), pregnanolone, pregnenolone and allopregnanolone
C2orf66		Textmining	STRING	0.669		Uncharaterized
NPSR1	Neuropeptide S receptor	Textmining	STRING	0.625		Promotes mobilization of intracellular Ca(2+) stores. Inhibits cell growth in response to NPS binding. Involved in pathogenesis of asthma and other IgE-mediated diseases
EYA3	Eyes absent homolog 3	Textmining	STRING	0.574	Nucleus	Promotes efficient DNA repair by dephosphorylating H2AX, promoting the recruitment of DNA repair complexes containing MDC1.
Transmembrane protein 217		Textmining	STRING	0.556		Uncharaterized
SOX-14	Transcription factor SOX-14	Textmining	STRING	0.536		Acts as a negative regulator of transcription
KRTAP5-2	Keratin-associated protein 5-2	Textmining	STRING	0.529		In the hair cortex, hair keratin intermediate filaments are embedded in an interfilamentous matrix, consisting of hair keratin-associated protein (KRTAP), which are essential for the formation of a rigid and resistant hair shaft through their extensive disulfide bond cross-linking with abundant cysteine residues of hair keratins.
TCEB3C	Elongin-A3	Textmining	STRING	0.526	Nucleus	A general transcription elongation factor that increases the RNA polymerase II transcription elongation past template-encoded arresting sites.

== Clinical significance ==
The gene ccdc190 is found to be related to some diseases. For example, it is found contributed significantly to cannabis dependence risk by sequence kernel association tests and found to be downregulated in nasopharyngeal carcinoma microarray data. Also, this gene is found to be a biomarker for short photoperiods for cells in pars tuberalis. The detailed relation for c1orf110 with phenotypes mentioned above still needs further study. Based on the microarray data on GEO database of NCBI, it can be found that the H3K9me2 methyltransferase G9a depletion can increase the expression amount of c1orf110 on breast cancer cell line. indicating that DNA methylation caused by breast cancer can lead to inhibition of ccdc190 expression. Also, the αSMA+ myofibroblast early depletion on pancreatic ductal adenocarcinoma mouse can lead to lower expression of ccdc190 in pancreas, suggesting the potential function of this gene in pancreatic cancer pathology.
