= SOX21 =

Protein-coding gene in the species Homo sapiens

Identifiers
- Aliases: SOX21, SOX25, SRY-box 21, SRY-box transcription factor 21
- External IDs: OMIM: 604974; MGI: 2654070; GeneCards: SOX21

Gene location (Human)
Chr.	Chromosome 13 (human)
Band	13q32.1	Start	94,709,622 bp
Band	13q32.1	End	94,712,545 bp

Gene location (Mouse)
Chr.	Chromosome 14 (mouse)
Band	14|14 E4	Start	118,470,644 bp
Band	14|14 E4	End	118,474,442 bp
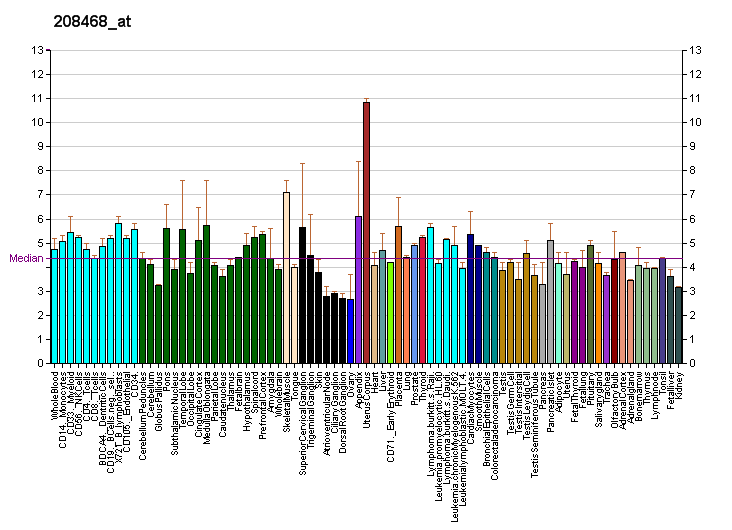
RNA expression pattern
Bgee	Human / Mouse (ortholog); Top expressed in: ventricular zone; ganglionic eminence; skin of leg; skin of abdomen; amygdala; caudate nucleus; mucosa of esophagus; putamen; nucleus accumbens; cingulate gyrus / Top expressed in: saccule; hair follicle; molar; otic placode; otic vesicle; epithelium of stomach; ventricular zone; medial ganglionic eminence; pyloric antrum; lip; More reference expression data
BioGPS	More reference expression data
Gene ontology
Molecular function	DNA-binding transcription factor activity; DNA binding; RNA polymerase II cis-regulatory region sequence-specific DNA binding; DNA-binding transcription activator activity, RNA polymerase II-specific; DNA-binding transcription factor activity, RNA polymerase II-specific
Cellular component	nucleus; cellular component
Biological process	hair follicle development; regulation of transcription by RNA polymerase II; hair cycle; regulation of transcription, DNA-templated; transcription, DNA-templated; stem cell differentiation; skin development; transcription by RNA polymerase II; positive regulation of transcription by RNA polymerase II; negative regulation of transcription by RNA polymerase II; cell differentiation; central nervous system development; neuron differentiation
Sources:Amigo / QuickGO
Orthologs
Databases	NCBI: entry; OMA: entry
Species	Human	Mouse
Entrez	11166	223227
Ensembl	ENSG00000125285	ENSMUSG00000061517
UniProt	Q9Y651	Q811W0
RefSeq (mRNA)	NM_007084	NM_177753
RefSeq (protein)	NP_009015	NP_808421
Location (UCSC)	Chr 13: 94.71 – 94.71 Mb	Chr 14: 118.47 – 118.47 Mb
PubMed search
- Wikidata
View/Edit Human	View/Edit Mouse

Transcription factor SOX-21 is a protein that in humans is encoded by the SOX21 gene. It is a member of the Sox gene family of transcription factors.

== Function ==
In the chick embryo, Sox21 promotes neuronal cellular differentiation by counteracting the activity of Sox1, Sox2, and Sox3, which maintain neural cells in an undifferentiated state.

SOX21 knockout mice display hair loss beginning from postnatal day 11. New hair regrowth was initiated a few days later but was followed by renewed hair loss. Sox21 is also expressed in the hair shaft cuticle in humans and consequently variants of the Sox21 gene could be responsible for some hair loss conditions in humans.

== See also ==
- SOX genes
