= SOX12 =

Protein-coding gene in the species Homo sapiens

Identifiers
- Aliases: SOX12, SOX22, SRY-box 12, SRY-box transcription factor 12
- External IDs: OMIM: 601947; MGI: 98360; GeneCards: SOX12

Gene location (Human)
Chr.	Chromosome 20 (human)
Band	20p13	Start	325,552 bp
Band	20p13	End	330,224 bp

Gene location (Mouse)
Chr.	Chromosome 2 (mouse)
Band	2|2 G3	Start	152,235,531 bp
Band	2|2 G3	End	152,239,983 bp
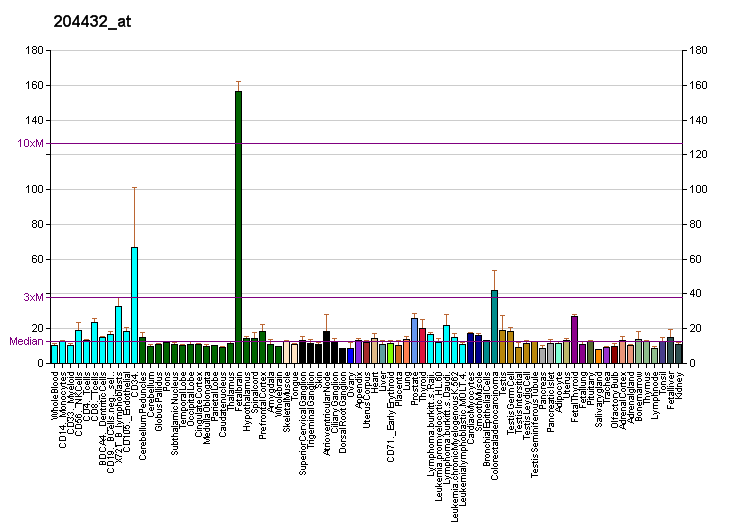
RNA expression pattern
Bgee	Human / Mouse (ortholog); Top expressed in: ganglionic eminence; ventricular zone; stromal cell of endometrium; apex of heart; right hemisphere of cerebellum; right uterine tube; right adrenal cortex; sural nerve; right ovary; right frontal lobe / Top expressed in: aortic valve; Gonadal ridge; genital tubercle; somite; ventricular zone; ascending aorta; maxillary prominence; mandibular prominence; internal carotid artery; external carotid artery; More reference expression data
BioGPS	More reference expression data
Gene ontology
Molecular function	DNA binding; transcription coactivator activity; DNA-binding transcription activator activity, RNA polymerase II-specific; transcription cis-regulatory region binding; DNA-binding transcription factor activity, RNA polymerase II-specific
Cellular component	protein-DNA complex; nucleus; nucleoplasm; cellular component
Biological process	regulation of transcription by RNA polymerase II; protein-DNA complex assembly; cell fate commitment; regulation of transcription, DNA-templated; transcription by RNA polymerase II; positive regulation of transcription by RNA polymerase II; spinal cord development; transcription, DNA-templated; cell differentiation
Sources:Amigo / QuickGO
Orthologs
Databases	NCBI: entry; OMA: entry
Species	Human	Mouse
Entrez	6666	20667
Ensembl	ENSG00000177732	ENSMUSG00000051817
UniProt	O15370	Q04890
RefSeq (mRNA)	NM_006943	NM_011438
RefSeq (protein)	NP_008874	NP_035568
Location (UCSC)	Chr 20: 0.33 – 0.33 Mb	Chr 2: 152.24 – 152.24 Mb
PubMed search
- Wikidata
View/Edit Human	View/Edit Mouse

SOX12 is a protein that in humans is encoded by the SOX12 gene. Sox12 belongs to the SoxC group of Sox family of transcription factors, together with Sox4 and Sox11. Sox12-null knockout mice appear normal, unlike Sox4 or Sox11 knockout mice. This probably comes from functional redundancy with Sox4 and Sox11. Sox12 is a weaker activator than both Sox4 and Sox11 in mouse.

Members of the SOX family of transcription factors are characterized by the presence of a DNA-binding high mobility group (HMG) domain, homologous to the HMG box of sex-determining region Y (SRY). Forming a subgroup of the HMG domain superfamily, SOX proteins have been implicated in cell fate decisions in a diverse range of developmental processes. SOX transcription factors have diverse tissue-specific expression patterns during early development and have been proposed to act as target-specific transcription factors and/or as chromatin structure regulatory elements. The protein encoded by this gene was identified as a SOX family member based on conserved domains and its expression in various tissues suggests a role in both differentiation and maintenance of several cell types.
