= C19orf67 =

Human protein-coding gene

Identifiers
- Aliases: C19orf67, chromosome 19 open reading frame 67
- External IDs: MGI: 1920703; GeneCards: C19orf67

Gene location (Human)
Chr.	Chromosome 19 (human)
Band	19p13.12	Start	14,081,624 bp
Band	19p13.12	End	14,085,875 bp

Gene location (Mouse)
Chr.	Chromosome 8 (mouse)
Band	8|8 C2	Start	84,728,131 bp
Band	8|8 C2	End	84,731,399 bp
RNA expression pattern
Bgee	Human / Mouse (ortholog); Top expressed in: testicle; left testis; right testis; placenta; right uterine tube; mucosa of transverse colon; sural nerve; renal cortex; right coronary artery; canal of the cervix / Top expressed in: seminiferous tubule; primary oocyte; secondary oocyte; zygote; spermatid; right kidney; embryo; spermatocyte; embryo; yolk sac; More reference expression data
BioGPS	n/a
Orthologs
Databases	NCBI: entry; OMA: entry
Species	Human	Mouse
Entrez	646457	73453
Ensembl	ENSG00000188032; ENSG00000288239	ENSMUSG00000046408
UniProt	A6NJJ6; A0A0A0MRA4	Q8CF25
RefSeq (mRNA)	NM_001277378	NM_183097
RefSeq (protein)	NP_001264307	NP_898920
Location (UCSC)	Chr 19: 14.08 – 14.09 Mb	Chr 8: 84.73 – 84.73 Mb
PubMed search
- Wikidata
View/Edit Human	View/Edit Mouse

UPF0575 protein C19orf67 is a protein which in humans is encoded by the C19orf67 gene. Orthologs of C19orf67 are found in many mammals, some reptiles, and most jawed fish. The protein is expressed at low levels throughout the body with the exception of the testis and breast tissue. Where it is expressed, the protein is predicted to be localized in the nucleus to carry out a function. The highly conserved and slowly evolving DUFF3314 region is predicted to form numerous alpha helices and may be vital to the function of the protein.

== Gene ==
In humans, C19orf67 is located on the minus strand of Chromosome 19 at 19p13.12 and spans 4,163 base pairs (bp).

The following genes are found near C19orf67 on the positive strand:

- MISP3
- Eukaryotic Translation Elongation Factor 1 Delta Pseudogene 1 (EEF1DP1)
- MicroRNA 1199 (MIR1199)
  Gene Neighborhood of C19orf67

The following genes are found near C19orf67 on the minus strand:

- catalytic subunit α of protein kinase A (PRKACA)
- Sterile Alpha Motif Domain Containing 1 (SAMD1)

== mRNA transcript ==
C19orf67 has three transcript variants, although the second and third variants are only predicted by an Ensembl analysis and not experimentally confirmed. Only the first two variants are protein-coding transcripts.

The first transcript consists of 1447bp while the second and third have 751bp and 656bp respectively. The mature mRNA of the longest isoform is made up from 6 exons.

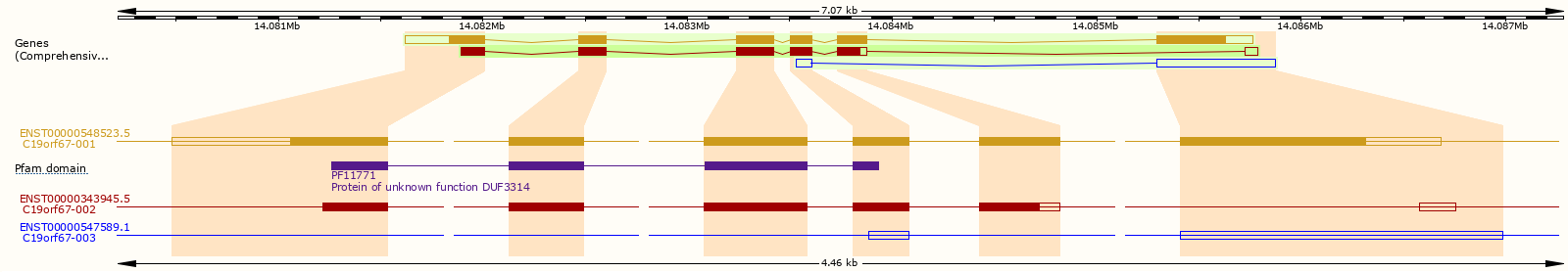
Splice Variants for C19orf67.

== Protein ==
The unmodified protein has 358 amino acids, predicted molecular weight of 40kDa, charge of -11, and isoelectric point of 5. 44 prolines were found along the protein, making up 12.3% of the total amino acid sequence. The proline content by percentage was found to be higher in UPF0575 than 95% of comparable human proteins. However, the amount of asparagine the protein is less abundant when compared to the human proteome.

=== Domains ===
Both isoforms contain DUF3314. Although the function is not yet well understood, conservation among numerous taxa indicate that it may be important to the function of the protein. The first isoform has a non-repeating proline-rich region from amino acids 12 to 80. The function of the region is not well understood but it may be involved in preventing helices from forming due to the rigid structure of proline.

=== Secondary structure ===
A cross-program consensus predicted that UPF0575 protein C19orf67 forms four alpha helices and two beta sheets in the following locations in the amino acid sequence:

Helix	52-62	90-108	115-125	153-180
Sheet	193-202	210-217		

=== Post-translational modifications ===
Acetylation is likely to occur at the N-terminus while the C-terminus is unlikely to be modified. O-Glycosylation is predicted to occur at amino acids 18 and 67. Several possible phosphorylation sites were identified along with the associated kinases:

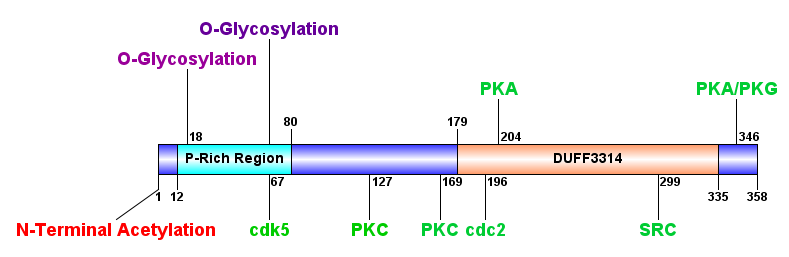
Predicted Post-Translational Modifications and Domains of UPF0575 C19orf67.

Location	Amino acid	Kinase
67	Serine	cdk5
127	Threonine	PKC
169	Threonine	PKC
196	Serine	cdc2
204	Serine	PKA
299	Tyrosine	SRC
346	Serine	PKA/PKG

=== Subcellular localization ===
UPF0575 protein C19orf67 is expected to be targeted in the nucleus, specifically the nucleolus.

== Expression and regulation ==
Abundance of C19orf67 found throughout the body in humans relative to abundances of other human proteins

=== Regulation of gene expression ===
The promoter region is predicted to start 1,303 bp upstream from the 5' UTR and consist of 1,447 bp, causing 144 bp to overlap with the 5' UTR.

A number of transcription factors such as FOXP1, SOX5, SOX6, SOX4, and MZF1 are likely to bind with the promoter, often acting to downregulate transcription. When regarding the expression of other genes, these transcription factors typically play a role in the development of various tissues such as the heart, lung, and also take part in the differentiation of early embryonic cells, and red blood cells.

=== Transcriptional regulation ===
It is suspected that the mature mRNA of C19orf67 forms a stem loop on the 3' UTR that spans from 1,296bp to 1,350bp of the transcript.

=== Tissue expression ===
In humans, UPF0575 protein C19orf67 is highly expressed in the testis and breast tissue, although it is also expressed at low levels in the stomach, cerebral cortex, thyroid gland, and salivary gland.

The protein product is less abundant than most of the human proteome in many tissues.

== Homology ==
=== Paralogs ===
There are no known paralogs of UPF0575 protein C19orf67, nor are there any known paralogous domains of DUF3314 found.

=== Orthologs ===
Orthologs of UPF0575 protein C19orf67 were found to be present among a wide variety of mammals with it being particularly well represented in rodentia and primates. Orthologs were also found in each reptilian order but were much more scarce in presence relative to mammals. A high number and variety of ray-finned fishes were found to have orthologs while there were fewer cartilaginous fish found to have orthologs; no jawless fish could be found with orthologs.

No orthologs are known to be present in birds or amphibians. No invertebrates, fungi, bacteria, or lower species have known orthologs.

BLAT and BLAST were used to create following table as a sample ortholog space for UPF0575 protein C19orf67. This table is not a complete list of orthologs, it is meant to display the span in which there are orthologs and the diversity of those species.

Genus and species	Common name	Accession number	Order	Divergence (MYA)	Sequence length	Identity	Similarity
Homo sapiens	Human	NP_001264307	Primate	0	358	--	--
Galeopterus variegatus	Sunda Flying Lemur	XP_008564240.1	Dermoptera	82	358	85%	89%
Miniopterus natalensis	Long-fingered bat	XP_016077689.1	Chiroptera	94	356	84%	89%
Ursus maritimus	Polar bear	XP_008709937.1	Carnivores	94	358	85%	89%
Mus musculus	House mouse	NP_898920.2	Rodentia	88	300	71%	74%
Gekko japonicus	Gekko	XP_015270669.1	Squamata	320	331	49%	63%
Chelonia mydas	Green Turtle	XP_007069233.1	Testudinata	320	345	49%	61%
Alligator mississippiensis	American alligator	XP_019353135.1	Crocodilia	320	297	45%	57%
Latimeria chalumnae	West Indian Coelacanth	XP_005995930.1	Coelacanthiformes	440	414	37%	50%
Salmo salar	Atlantic Salmon	XP_013986580.1	Salmoniformes	432	336	35%	45%
Danio rerio	Zebrafish	NP_001083047.1	Cypriniformes	432	344	32%	44%
Pygocentrus nattereri	Red piranha	XP_017554468.1	Characiformes	432	348	32%	43%

=== Molecular evolution ===
UPF0575 protein C19orf67 consists of one family and there are no apparent duplications throughout the evolution of UPF0575 protein C19orf67.

The DUF3314 region of the gene appears to have diverged at a slower rate relative to the rest of the gene, indicating that that region may have been undergoing purifying selection because that region played an important role in the protein.

== Clinical significance ==
In one case study, C19orf67 was one of 29 genes on chromosome 19 lost due to deletions caused by chromosomal rearrangements. The rearrangements resulted neural development issues and behavioral abnormalities, although it is not known whether C19orf67 played an active role in the resulting phenotypes. In a different study, when a portion of chromosome 19 that also included C19orf67 was deleted, developmental issues such as Intrauterine growth restriction, premature birth, and muscular hypotonia, occurred.

C19orf67, among many other genes, may be used as a possible marker to detect mature beta cells.
