= SOX7 =

Protein-coding gene in the species Homo sapiens

Identifiers
- Aliases: SOX7, SRY-box 7, SRY-box transcription factor 7
- External IDs: OMIM: 612202; MGI: 98369; GeneCards: SOX7

Gene location (Human)
Chr.	Chromosome 8 (human)
Band	8p23.1	Start	10,723,768 bp
Band	8p23.1	End	10,730,511 bp

Gene location (Mouse)
Chr.	Chromosome 14 (mouse)
Band	14|14 D1	Start	64,181,122 bp
Band	14|14 D1	End	64,188,181 bp
RNA expression pattern
Bgee	Human / Mouse (ortholog); Top expressed in: placenta; vagina; apex of heart; skin of abdomen; upper lobe of left lung; left ventricle; testicle; subcutaneous adipose tissue; skin of leg; olfactory zone of nasal mucosa / Top expressed in: right lung lobe; cardiac muscle tissue of left ventricle; left lung lobe; lip; atrium; atrioventricular valve; urethra; renal vein; extraocular muscle; endocardial cushion; More reference expression data
BioGPS	n/a
Gene ontology
Molecular function	DNA binding; protein binding; DNA-binding transcription factor activity; transcription factor activity, RNA polymerase II distal enhancer sequence-specific binding; sequence-specific DNA binding; DNA-binding transcription factor activity, RNA polymerase II-specific
Cellular component	cytoplasm; nucleus; nucleoplasm
Biological process	regulation of canonical Wnt signaling pathway; positive regulation of cysteine-type endopeptidase activity involved in apoptotic process; endoderm formation; negative regulation of transcription, DNA-templated; regulation of transcription, DNA-templated; transcription, DNA-templated; negative regulation of cell population proliferation; regulation of transcription by RNA polymerase II; positive regulation of transcription, DNA-templated; negative regulation of transcription by RNA polymerase II; cell differentiation
Sources:Amigo / QuickGO
Orthologs
Databases	NCBI: entry; OMA: entry
Species	Human	Mouse
Entrez	83595	20680
Ensembl	ENSG00000171056; ENSG00000285438	ENSMUSG00000063060
UniProt	Q9BT81	P40646
RefSeq (mRNA)	NM_031439	NM_011446
RefSeq (protein)	NP_113627	NP_035576
Location (UCSC)	Chr 8: 10.72 – 10.73 Mb	Chr 14: 64.18 – 64.19 Mb
PubMed search
- Wikidata
View/Edit Human	View/Edit Mouse

SRY-box 7 is a protein that in humans is encoded by the SOX7 gene.

== Function ==
This gene encodes a member of the SOX (SRY-related HMG-box) family of transcription factors involved in the regulation of embryonic development and in the determination of the cell fate. The encoded protein may act as a transcriptional regulator after forming a protein complex with other proteins. A similar protein in mice is involved in the regulation of the wingless-type MMTV integration site family (Wnt) pathway. [provided by RefSeq, Jul 2008].

SOX7 is a transcription factor that comes from the SRY-related HMG-Box family of transcription factors. These factors play a significant developmental role in regulating processes such as hematopoiesis, vasculogenesis, and cardiogenesis during the development of the embryo. Additionally, SOX7 is unique as it has been shown to also have tumor-suppressive effects, and downregulation of this gene has been seen in many forms of cancer. SOX7 as well as SOX17 and SOX18 have been known to work together to play a significant role in cardiovascular development, but continued research continues to identify SOX7 as playing a significant role in cancerous tumor suppression.

A homozygous deletion of the second exon in SOX7 was embryonically lethal, and a heterozygous deletion resulted in a congenital diaphragmatic hernia forming.

== Clinical significance ==
The protein may play a role in tumorigenesis.
