= C5orf52 =

Human gene

Identifiers
- Aliases: C5orf52, chromosome 5 open reading frame 52
- External IDs: MGI: 1914680; HomoloGene: 12129; GeneCards: C5orf52; OMA:C5orf52 - orthologs

Gene location (Human)
Chr.	Chromosome 5 (human)
Band	5q33.3	Start	157,671,533 bp
Band	5q33.3	End	157,680,158 bp

Gene location (Mouse)
Chr.	Chromosome 11 (mouse)
Band	11|11 A1	Start	3,836,088 bp
Band	11|11 A1	End	3,845,098 bp
RNA expression pattern
Bgee	Human / Mouse (ortholog); Top expressed in: left testis; right testis; testicle; mucosa of transverse colon; rectum; duodenum; right uterine tube; prefrontal cortex; hypothalamus; anterior cingulate cortex / Top expressed in: zygote; spermatid; spermatocyte; secondary oocyte; morula; embryo; ventricular zone; testicle; seminiferous tubule; lip; More reference expression data
BioGPS	n/a
Orthologs
Species	Human	Mouse
Entrez	100190949	67430
Ensembl	ENSG00000187658	ENSMUSG00000020434
UniProt	A6NGY3	Q9CR34
RefSeq (mRNA)	NM_001145132	NM_026150
RefSeq (protein)	NP_001138604	NP_080426
Location (UCSC)	Chr 5: 157.67 – 157.68 Mb	Chr 11: 3.84 – 3.85 Mb
PubMed search
- Wikidata
View/Edit Human	View/Edit Mouse

Chromosome 5 open reading frame 52 (C5orf52) is a gene of unknown function. It encodes the protein A6NGY3. The C5orf52 gene is strongly predicted to be localized in the cytoplasm.

== Gene ==
This gene is found on the positive strand of chromosome 5 (5q33.3) which spans a total of 9218 nucleotides that make up the gene. C5orf52 codes for 2 introns and 3 exons with 537 base pairs of this gene being antisense to splice gene SOX30, which raises the possibility of regulated alternate expression.

=== Gene expression ===
There are multiple sources that predict C5orf52 being tissue-specific in normal tissues. It was expressed in the appendix, brain, colon, duodenum, endometrium, gall bladder, kidney, lung, lymph node, prostate, small intestine, spleen, urinary bladder, and was expressed in higher levels in the testis.

== RNA ==
There is only one known isoform (C5orf52 isoform X1). Its sequence has a length of 1023 base pairs that encodes for 3 exons. Transcription starts at the 385th base pair and stops at the 864th base pair. This gene contains both a 5' UTR (length of 387 nucleotides) and a 3' UTR (length of 162 nucleotides).

== Protein ==
The DUF5528 A6NGY3 is encoded by the C5orf52 gene and has a length of 159 amino acids. The molecular mass is 17.9 kDa and the isoelectric point is 10.8.

=== Function ===
Although the exact function of C5orf52 is unknown in humans, there is large evidence for the gene being associated with Spermatogenesis as there is very high expression in the testis, with lowered expression in the brain, colon, duodenum, and small intestine. C5orf52 does not have any transmembrane domains or signal sequences.

=== Structure ===
The protein is slightly serine rich, which is concentrated towards the beginning of the residue, and is overall slightly deficient in aspartic acid. The distribution of charged positive and negative amino acids in the protein are equally spread out and result in no big charged clusters. The predicted tertiary structures of the human protein were compiled with the use of multiple bioinformatic tools. All of the tools aided in predicting the protein to contain a long string of alpha helices near the C-terminus and extended strands near the N-terminus.

== Gene level regulation ==
Different sites were identified to be present on the protein and these include: N-myristoylation site, amidation site, N-glycosylation site, cAMP- and cGMP-dependent protein kinase phosphorylation site, Casein kinase II phosphorylation site, and protein kinase C phosphorylation site. Other areas of the protein were predicted phosphorylation sites in Serine, Threonine, and Tyrosine. Only two Serines and one Threonine were strongly conserved with close orthologs.

== Homology and evolution ==
=== Paralogs ===
There are no predicted paralogs for C5orf52 in Homo sapiens.

=== Orthologs ===
Orthologs were found by comparing the C5orf52 gene across NCBI’s database with different species' genetic codes. Twenty organisms from a variety of orders were selected to compare and further investigate. These species included mammals, reptiles, amphibians, birds, and an invertebrate. The data in the table was sorted by the sequence percent identity to the human protein and then sorted by date of divergence.

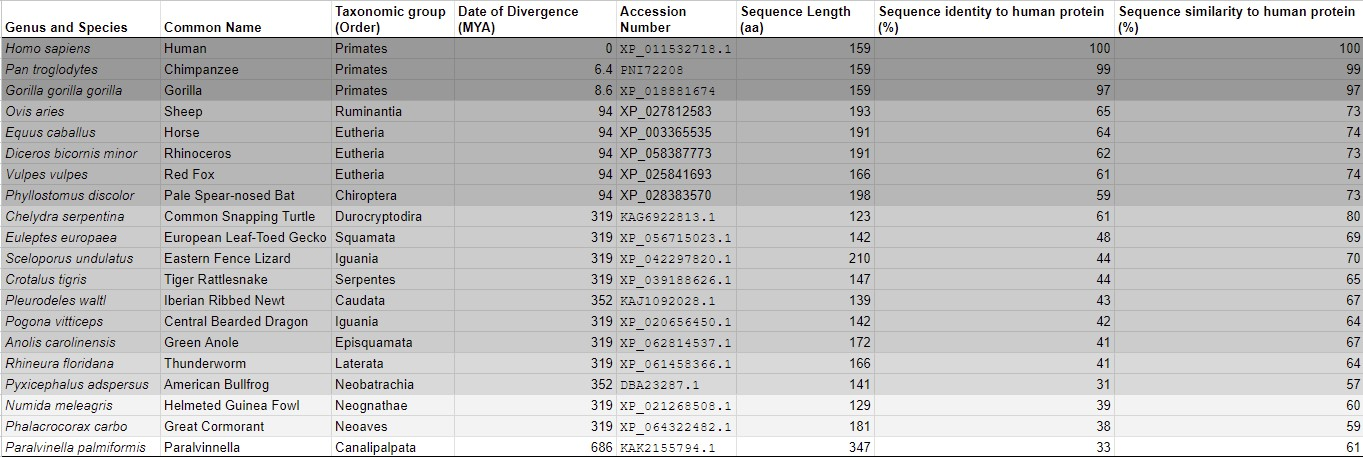

Orthologs of Homo sapiens C5orf52. Data is sorted by sequence identity and then date of divergence. Shading is associated with the grouping of organisms

=== Phylogeny ===
The oldest orthologs of human c5orf52 was found in Paralvinella palmiformis, which is an invertebrate with a date of divergence of around 686 million years ago. The length of the tree branch or the amount of time seems to be smaller with orthologs closer to the Humans. The upper cluster of animals are all mammals, which would follow the trend with similar identities being correlated to a smaller distance away from the gene in humans. The length of the branch is proportional to the date of divergence from humans.

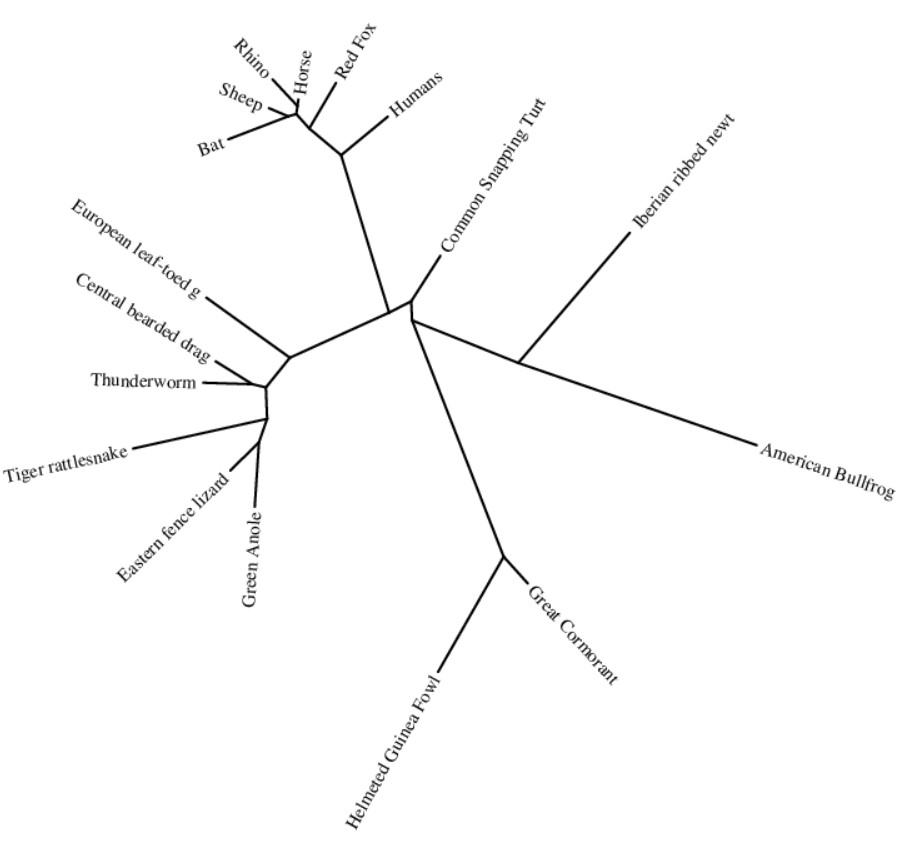

Phylogenetic Tree containing ortholog species to the Human gene C5orf52. Tree is in Radial format meaning the distance of the line from the main branch describes species divergence. Source Phylogeny.fr

=== Protein divergence ===
When the human cytochrome C and fibrinogen alpha chain sequences were compared to its orthologs, the protein m (corrected percent divergence) trendline was very similar to that of the fibrinogen alpha chain. Fibrinogen alpha chain sequence has a fast rate of change over time, which indicates that human c5orf52 does as well.

=== Conserved regions ===
Multiple sequence alignments indicated amino acid residue conservation throughout the C5orf52 with close orthologs. The most highly conserved regions spanned throughout the middle of the protein around amino acid 90 and had strong clumped conservation towards the C-terminus, which didn't have strong conservation.

== Interactions ==
C5orf52 is not predicted to have any binary interactions with proteins. The true reason for this is unknown at this point. One possible explanation is the lack of any transmembrane domains. It may also be because of the lack of information on C5orf52. It may play a role in specialized pathways and conditions that aren’t explored yet in the database. A neighboring gene, upstream on the negative strand, SOX30, was found to have 63 binary interactions on PSICQUIC.
