= SOX15 =

Protein-coding gene in the species Homo sapiens

Identifiers
- Aliases: SOX15, SOX20, SOX26, SOX27, SRY-box 15, SRY-box transcription factor 15
- External IDs: OMIM: 601297; MGI: 98363; GeneCards: SOX15

Gene location (Human)
Chr.	Chromosome 17 (human)
Band	17p13.1	Start	7,588,178 bp
Band	17p13.1	End	7,590,094 bp

Gene location (Mouse)
Chr.	Chromosome 11 (mouse)
Band	11 B3|11 42.86 cM	Start	69,546,140 bp
Band	11 B3|11 42.86 cM	End	69,547,553 bp
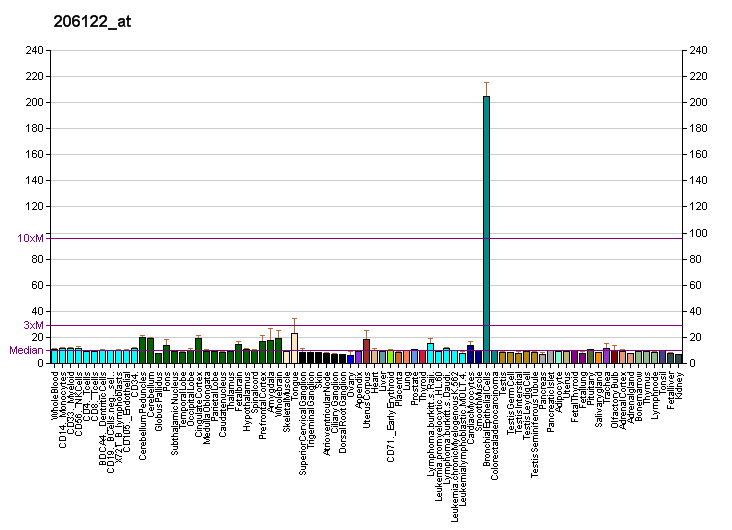

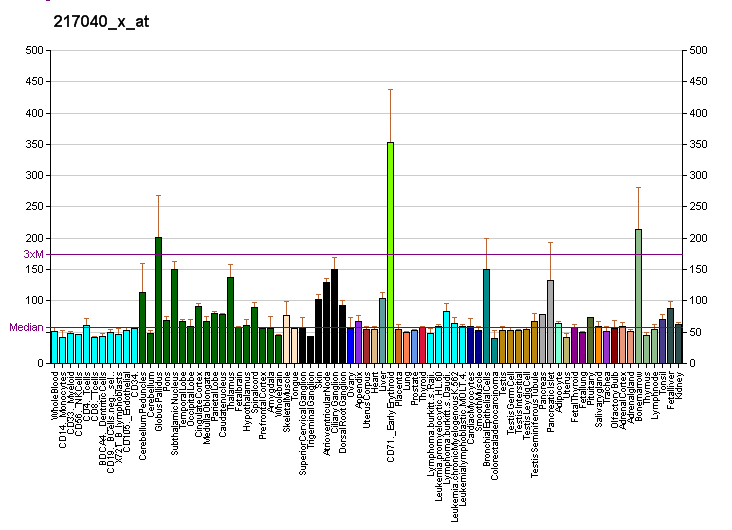
RNA expression pattern
Bgee	Human / Mouse (ortholog); Top expressed in: oocyte; secondary oocyte; skin of abdomen; skin of leg; mucosa of pharynx; vagina; right hemisphere of cerebellum; olfactory zone of nasal mucosa; gonad; epithelium of esophagus / Top expressed in: morula; blastocyst; morula; corneal stroma; transitional epithelium of urinary bladder; lip; secondary oocyte; zygote; esophagus; entorhinal cortex; More reference expression data
BioGPS	More reference expression data
Gene ontology
Molecular function	DNA binding; DNA-binding transcription factor activity; chromatin binding; protein binding; protein heterodimerization activity; DNA-binding transcription factor activity, RNA polymerase II-specific; DNA-binding transcription activator activity, RNA polymerase II-specific
Cellular component	cytoplasm; nucleus
Biological process	positive regulation of myoblast proliferation; cell differentiation; male gonad development; regulation of transcription, DNA-templated; positive regulation of satellite cell activation involved in skeletal muscle regeneration; negative regulation of striated muscle tissue development; regulation of transcription by RNA polymerase II; positive regulation of G0 to G1 transition; negative regulation of transcription by RNA polymerase II; chromatin organization; myoblast development; skeletal muscle tissue regeneration; positive regulation of transcription by RNA polymerase II; central nervous system development; neuron differentiation
Sources:Amigo / QuickGO
Orthologs
Databases	NCBI: entry; OMA: entry
Species	Human	Mouse
Entrez	6665	20670
Ensembl	ENSG00000129194	ENSMUSG00000041287
UniProt	O60248	P43267
RefSeq (mRNA)	NM_006942	NM_009235
RefSeq (protein)	NP_008873	NP_033261
Location (UCSC)	Chr 17: 7.59 – 7.59 Mb	Chr 11: 69.55 – 69.55 Mb
PubMed search
- Wikidata
View/Edit Human	View/Edit Mouse

Protein SOX-15 is a protein that in humans is encoded by the SOX15 gene.

This gene encodes a member of the SOX (SRY-related HMG-box) family of transcription factors involved in the regulation of embryonic development and in the determination of the cell fate. The encoded protein may act as a transcriptional regulator after forming a protein complex with other proteins.

== See also ==
- SOX genes
