= Centromere protein K =

Protein found in humans

CENPK

Identifiers
- Aliases: CENPK, AF5alpha, CENP-K, P33, Solt, FKSG14, centromere protein K
- External IDs: OMIM: 611502; MGI: 1926210; GeneCards: CENPK

Gene location (Human)
Chr.	Chromosome 5 (human)
Band	5q12.3	Start	65,517,766 bp
Band	5q12.3	End	65,563,168 bp

Gene location (Mouse)
Chr.	Chromosome 13 (mouse)
Band	13|13 D1	Start	104,365,119 bp
Band	13|13 D1	End	104,388,900 bp
RNA expression pattern
Bgee	Human / Mouse (ortholog); Top expressed in: oocyte; ventricular zone; testicle; secondary oocyte; gonad; ganglionic eminence; thymus; rectum; appendix; bone marrow / Top expressed in: fetal liver hematopoietic progenitor cell; medial ganglionic eminence; primitive streak; genital tubercle; vas deferens; spermatid; otic placode; Paneth cell; embryo; maxillary prominence; More reference expression data
BioGPS	n/a
Gene ontology
Molecular function	protein binding
Cellular component	cytosol; nucleus; nucleoplasm; chromosome, centromeric region; chromosome; kinetochore
Biological process	CENP-A containing chromatin assembly; kinetochore assembly; mitotic sister chromatid segregation
Sources:Amigo / QuickGO
Orthologs
Databases	NCBI: entry; OMA: entry
Species	Human	Mouse
Entrez	64105	60411
Ensembl	ENSG00000123219	ENSMUSG00000021714
UniProt	Q9BS16	Q9ESN5
RefSeq (mRNA)	NM_001267038; NM_022145; NM_001349367; NM_001349368; NM_001349369	NM_021790; NM_181061; NM_001377093; NM_001377094; NM_001377095
RefSeq (protein)	NP_001253967; NP_071428; NP_001336296; NP_001336297; NP_001336298	NP_068562; NP_851406; NP_001364022; NP_001364023; NP_001364024
Location (UCSC)	Chr 5: 65.52 – 65.56 Mb	Chr 13: 104.37 – 104.39 Mb
PubMed search
- Wikidata
View/Edit Human	View/Edit Mouse

Centromere protein K is a protein that in humans is encoded by the CENPK gene.

== Interactions ==
CENPK has been shown to interact with SOX6.
