= SOX8 =

Protein-coding gene in the species Homo sapiens

Identifiers
- Aliases: SOX8, SRY-box 8, SRY-box transcription factor 8
- External IDs: OMIM: 605923; MGI: 98370; GeneCards: SOX8

Gene location (Human)
Chr.	Chromosome 16 (human)
Band	16p13.3	Start	981,770 bp
Band	16p13.3	End	986,979 bp

Gene location (Mouse)
Chr.	Chromosome 17 (mouse)
Band	17 A3.3|17 12.69 cM	Start	25,784,866 bp
Band	17 A3.3|17 12.69 cM	End	25,789,660 bp
RNA expression pattern
Bgee	Human / Mouse (ortholog); Top expressed in: inferior ganglion of vagus nerve; external globus pallidus; subthalamic nucleus; parotid gland; pars reticulata; ventral tegmental area; medulla oblongata; spinal cord; C1 segment; superior vestibular nucleus / Top expressed in: metatarsal bones; lumbar subsegment of spinal cord; zygote; fourth metatarsal bone; Bowman's capsule; second metatarsal bone; visual cortex; third metatarsal bone; primary visual cortex; secondary oocyte; More reference expression data
BioGPS	n/a
Gene ontology
Molecular function	DNA binding; sequence-specific DNA binding; DNA-binding transcription factor activity; transcription factor binding; protein heterodimerization activity; RNA polymerase II core promoter sequence-specific DNA binding; DNA-binding transcription factor activity, RNA polymerase II-specific; DNA-binding transcription activator activity, RNA polymerase II-specific
Cellular component	cytoplasm; nucleus
Biological process	positive regulation of osteoblast proliferation; cell fate commitment; negative regulation of myoblast differentiation; positive regulation of branching involved in ureteric bud morphogenesis; male gonad development; peripheral nervous system development; regulation of transcription, DNA-templated; morphogenesis of a branching epithelium; ureter morphogenesis; regulation of hormone levels; oligodendrocyte differentiation; negative regulation of apoptotic process; in utero embryonic development; cell maturation; Sertoli cell development; transcription, DNA-templated; metanephric nephron tubule formation; positive regulation of transcription, DNA-templated; negative regulation of photoreceptor cell differentiation; enteric nervous system development; renal vesicle induction; positive regulation of kidney development; positive regulation of gene expression; retina development in camera-type eye; astrocyte fate commitment; osteoblast differentiation; neural crest cell migration; spermatogenesis; retinal rod cell differentiation; skeletal muscle cell differentiation; adipose tissue development; negative regulation of transcription, DNA-templated; fat cell differentiation; signal transduction; positive regulation of transcription by RNA polymerase II; positive regulation of gliogenesis; morphogenesis of an epithelium; central nervous system development
Sources:Amigo / QuickGO
Orthologs
Databases	NCBI: entry; OMA: entry
Species	Human	Mouse
Entrez	30812	20681
Ensembl	ENSG00000005513	ENSMUSG00000024176
UniProt	P57073	Q04886
RefSeq (mRNA)	NM_014587	NM_011447
RefSeq (protein)	NP_055402	NP_035577
Location (UCSC)	Chr 16: 0.98 – 0.99 Mb	Chr 17: 25.78 – 25.79 Mb
PubMed search
- Wikidata
View/Edit Human	View/Edit Mouse

Transcription factor SOX-8 is a protein that in humans is encoded by the SOX8 gene.

This gene encodes a member of the SOX (SRY-related HMG-box) family of transcription factors involved in the regulation of embryonic development and in the determination of the cell fate. The encoded protein may act as a transcriptional activator after forming a protein complex with other proteins. This protein may be involved in brain development and function. Haploinsufficiency for this protein may contribute to the intellectual disability found in haemoglobin H-related mental retardation (ATR-16 syndrome).

== See also ==
- SOX genes
