= Lamb–Shaffer syndrome =

- Autosomal dominant pattern is the inheritance pattern of this condition.
- Specialty: Medical genetics

Lamb–Shaffer syndrome is a rare autosomal dominant genetic condition. Less than 40 cases have been reported by 2018.

== Signs and symptoms ==
Clinical features include

- Global developmental delay
- Significant speech delay
- Hypotonia
- Micrognathia
- Scoliosis
- Defects in motor function, both fine and gross
- Optic atrophy
- Oculomotor apraxia
- Strabismus
- Frontal bossing
- Ear abnormalities
- Low nasal bridge
- Epicanthal folds
- Midline tongue groove

== Genetics ==
This condition is caused by mutations in the SRY-related HMG-box (SOX5) gene. This gene encodes a protein in the family of transcription factors involved in embryonic and cellular development.

The gene is located on the short arm of chromosome 12 (12p12).

A study published in 2019 examining 34 families shows that 74% (25/34 families) of cases of the condition are likely to be of de novo occurrence, as the variants could not be detected in parental blood samples. In 15% (5/34 families) of the patients, the condition was likely inherited from a mosaic parent. In 3% (1/34), the condition was inherited from an affected parent. This means that the majority of the patients have parents who are unaffected whereas inheritance is also possible.

== Pathogenesis ==
It is unclear how this mutation causes the clinical picture.

== Diagnosis ==
The diagnosis may be suspected based on the constellation of clinical features, but may only be determined by a genetic test. The full exome sequencing test determines the partial deletion, deletion, or mutation to the SOX5 gene. It is made by sequencing the SOX5 gene responsible for the cells that facilitate information transfer in the brain. Symptoms of Lamb-Shaffer syndrome include fine and gross motor delays, speech delay, global developmental delay, hypotonia, and vision issues, commonly misdiagnosed as an autism spectrum disorder.

== Treatment ==
There is currently no curative treatment for this condition. Supportive management is all that is currently available.

== Epidemiology ==
This is a rare condition with a prevalence of < 1/10^{6}. The total number of cases reported to date is <550.

== History ==
This condition was first described by Lamb et al in 2012.
