= SOX13 =

Protein-coding gene in humans

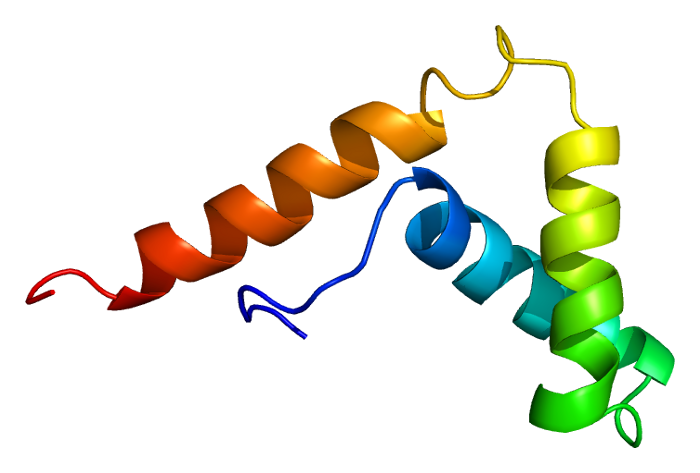

Identifiers
- Aliases: SOX13, ICA12, Sox-13, SRY-box 13, SRY-box transcription factor 13
- External IDs: OMIM: 604748; MGI: 98361; GeneCards: SOX13

Gene location (Human)
Chr.	Chromosome 1 (human)
Band	1q32.1	Start	204,073,115 bp
Band	1q32.1	End	204,127,743 bp

Gene location (Mouse)
Chr.	Chromosome 1 (mouse)
Band	1|1 E4	Start	133,310,041 bp
Band	1|1 E4	End	133,352,115 bp
RNA expression pattern
Bgee	Human / Mouse (ortholog); Top expressed in: sural nerve; right lung; body of uterus; canal of the cervix; popliteal artery; tibial arteries; left uterine tube; right uterine tube; upper lobe of left lung; ectocervix / Top expressed in: saccule; otic placode; otic vesicle; tail of embryo; intestinal villus; Ileal epithelium; lactiferous gland; ventricular zone; choroid plexus of fourth ventricle; lens; More reference expression data
BioGPS	n/a
Gene ontology
Molecular function	DNA-binding transcription factor activity; sequence-specific DNA binding; DNA binding; RNA polymerase II transcription regulatory region sequence-specific DNA binding; protein binding; DNA-binding transcription factor activity, RNA polymerase II-specific
Cellular component	nucleus; nucleoplasm
Biological process	anatomical structure morphogenesis; regulation of transcription, DNA-templated; transcription, DNA-templated; regulation of gamma-delta T cell differentiation; regulation of transcription by RNA polymerase II; cell fate commitment; negative regulation of transcription, DNA-templated; positive regulation of transcription by RNA polymerase II
Sources:Amigo / QuickGO
Orthologs
Databases	NCBI: entry; OMA: entry
Species	Human	Mouse
Entrez	9580	20668
Ensembl	ENSG00000143842	ENSMUSG00000070643
UniProt	Q9UN79	Q04891
RefSeq (mRNA)	NM_005686	NM_011439
RefSeq (protein)	NP_005677	NP_035569
Location (UCSC)	Chr 1: 204.07 – 204.13 Mb	Chr 1: 133.31 – 133.35 Mb
PubMed search
- Wikidata
View/Edit Human	View/Edit Mouse

Transcription factor SOX-13 is a protein that in humans is encoded by the SOX13 gene.

== Function ==
This gene encodes a member of the SOX (SRY-related HMG-box) family of transcription factors involved in the regulation of embryonic development and in the determination of cell fate. The encoded protein may act as a transcriptional regulator after forming a protein complex with other proteins. It has also been determined to be a type-1 diabetes autoantigen, also known as islet cell antibody 12.

In melanocytic cells SOX13 gene expression may be regulated by MITF.

== See also ==
- SOX genes
