= SOX1 =

Transcription factor gene of the SOX family

Identifiers
- Aliases: SOX1, SRY-box 1, SRY-box transcription factor 1
- External IDs: OMIM: 602148; MGI: 98357; GeneCards: SOX1

Gene location (Human)
Chr.	Chromosome 13 (human)
Band	13q34	Start	112,067,149 bp
Band	13q34	End	112,071,706 bp

Gene location (Mouse)
Chr.	Chromosome 8 (mouse)
Band	8 A1.1|8 5.73 cM	Start	12,445,295 bp
Band	8 A1.1|8 5.73 cM	End	12,450,126 bp
RNA expression pattern
Bgee	Human / Mouse (ortholog); Top expressed in: ventricular zone; ganglionic eminence; gonad; secondary oocyte; buccal mucosa cell; testicle; hypothalamus; amygdala; Brodmann area 46; entorhinal cortex / Top expressed in: medial ganglionic eminence; Rostral migratory stream; epithelium of lens; suprachiasmatic nucleus; lateral septal nucleus; olfactory tubercle; lumbar subsegment of spinal cord; ventricular zone; median eminence; ventromedial nucleus; More reference expression data
BioGPS	n/a
Gene ontology
Molecular function	DNA-binding transcription factor activity; RNA polymerase II cis-regulatory region sequence-specific DNA binding; DNA binding; sequence-specific DNA binding; DNA-binding transcription activator activity, RNA polymerase II-specific; core promoter sequence-specific DNA binding; protein binding; DNA-binding transcription factor activity, RNA polymerase II-specific
Cellular component	nucleus
Biological process	forebrain neuron development; ventral spinal cord interneuron specification; forebrain development; neuron migration; regulation of transcription, DNA-templated; chromatin organization; lens morphogenesis in camera-type eye; transcription by RNA polymerase II; transcription, DNA-templated; positive regulation of transcription by RNA polymerase II; nervous system development; forebrain neuron differentiation; cellular response to leukemia inhibitory factor; cell differentiation; central nervous system development; neuron differentiation
Sources:Amigo / QuickGO
Orthologs
Databases	NCBI: entry; OMA: entry
Species	Human	Mouse
Entrez	6656	20664
Ensembl	ENSG00000182968	ENSMUSG00000096014
UniProt	O00570	P53783
RefSeq (mRNA)	NM_005986	NM_009233
RefSeq (protein)	NP_005977	NP_033259
Location (UCSC)	Chr 13: 112.07 – 112.07 Mb	Chr 8: 12.45 – 12.45 Mb
PubMed search
- Wikidata
View/Edit Human	View/Edit Mouse

SOX1 is a gene that encodes a transcription factor with a HMG-box (high mobility group) DNA-binding domain and functions primarily in neurogenesis. SOX1, SOX2 and SOX3, members of the SOX gene family (specifically the SOXB1 group), contain transcription factors related to SRY, the testis-determining factor.

SOX1 exerts its importance in its role in development of the central nervous system (neurogenesis) and in particular the development of the eye, where it is functionally redundant with SOX3 and to a lesser degree SOX2, and maintenance of neural progenitor cell identity. SOX1 expression is restricted to the neuroectoderm by proliferating progenitor cells in the tetrapod embryo. The induction of this neuroectoderm occurs upon expression of the SOX1 gene. In ectodermal cells committed to a certain cell fate, SOX1 has shown to be one of the earliest transcription factors expressed. In particular, SOX1 is first detected in the late head fold stage.

== Clinical significance ==
=== Striatum development ===
SOX1 is expressed particularly in the ventral striatum, and Sox1-deficient mice have altered striatum development, leading e.g. to epilepsy.

=== Lens development ===
SOX1 has shown clinical significance in its direct regulation of gamma-crystallin genes, which is vital for lens development in mice. Gamma-crystallins serve as a key structural component in lens fiber cells in both mammals and amphibians. Research has shown direct deletion of the SOX1 gene in mice causes cataracts and microphthalmia. These mutant lenses fail to elongate due to the absence of gamma-crystallins.

=== SOXB1 group redundant roles ===
SOX1 is a member of the SOX gene family, in particular the SOXB1 group, which includes SOX1, SOX2, and SOX3. The SOX gene family encodes transcription factors. It is suggested the three members of the SOXB1 group have redundant roles in the development of neural stem cells. This group of SOX genes regulate neural progenitor identity. Each of these proteins have unique neural markers. Overexpression of either SOX1, SOX2, or SOX 3 increases neural progenitors and prevents neural differentiation. In non-mammalian vertebrates, loss of one SOXB1 protein results in minor phenotypic differences. This supports the claim that SOXB1 group proteins have redundant roles.

== See also ==
- Neurogenesis
