= SOX5 =

Protein-coding gene in Homo sapiens

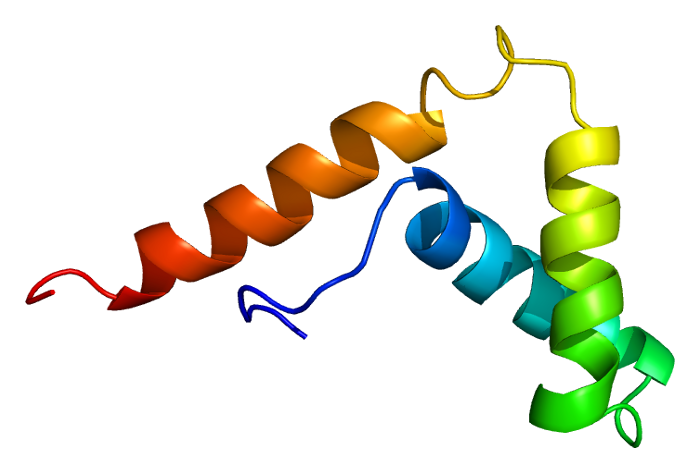

Identifiers
- Aliases: SOX5, L-L-SOX5B, L-SOX5F, LAMSHF, SRY-box 5, SRY-box transcription factor 5
- External IDs: OMIM: 604975; MGI: 98367; GeneCards: SOX5

Gene location (Human)
| Chr. | Chromosome 12 (human) |
| Band | 12p12.1 | Start | 23,529,504 bp |
| Band | 12p12.1 | End | 24,562,544 bp |

Gene location (Mouse)
| Chr. | Chromosome 6 (mouse) |
| Band | 6 G3|6 76.14 cM | Start | 143,828,425 bp |
| Band | 6 G3|6 76.14 cM | End | 144,781,977 bp |
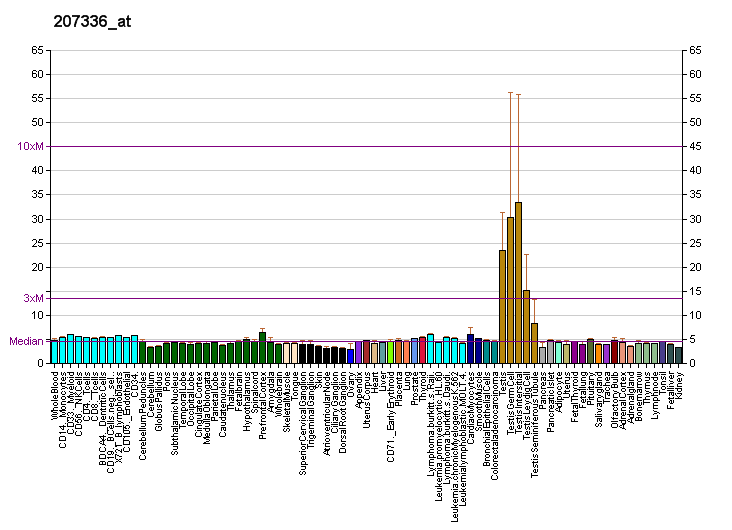
RNA expression pattern
| Bgee | Human / Mouse (ortholog); Top expressed in: Achilles tendon; synovial joint; sural nerve; tibia; ganglionic eminence; ventricular zone; cartilage tissue; left testis; right testis; skin of thigh / Top expressed in: seminiferous tubule; spermatid; ganglionic eminence; Rostral migratory stream; lumbar subsegment of spinal cord; subiculum; foot; ankle joint; lateral geniculate nucleus; external carotid artery; More reference expression data |
| BioGPS | More reference expression data |
Gene ontology
| Molecular function | DNA-binding transcription factor activity; DNA binding; protein binding; DNA-binding transcription factor activity, RNA polymerase II-specific |
| Cellular component | nucleus |
| Biological process | cellular response to transforming growth factor beta stimulus; regulation of transcription, DNA-templated; transcription by RNA polymerase II; positive regulation of cartilage development; positive regulation of chondrocyte differentiation; positive regulation of mesenchymal stem cell differentiation; transcription, DNA-templated; asymmetric neuroblast division; regulation of transcription by RNA polymerase II; cell fate commitment; negative regulation of transcription, DNA-templated; positive regulation of transcription by RNA polymerase II |
Sources:Amigo / QuickGO
Orthologs
| Databases | NCBI: entry; OMA: entry |
| Species | Human | Mouse |
| Entrez | 6660 | 20678 |
| Ensembl | ENSG00000134532 | ENSMUSG00000041540 |
| UniProt | P35711 | P35710 |
| RefSeq (mRNA) | NM_001261414; NM_001261415; NM_006940; NM_152989; NM_178010 NM_001330785 | NM_001113559; NM_001243163; NM_011444; NM_001347506 |
| RefSeq (protein) | NP_001248343; NP_001248344; NP_001317714; NP_008871; NP_694534 NP_821078 | NP_001107031; NP_001230092; NP_001334435; NP_035574 |
| Location (UCSC) | Chr 12: 23.53 – 24.56 Mb | Chr 6: 143.83 – 144.78 Mb |
| PubMed search |
- Wikidata
| View/Edit Human | View/Edit Mouse |

Transcription factor SOX-5 is a protein that in humans is encoded by the SOX5 gene.

== Function ==
This gene encodes a member of the SOX (SRY-related HMG-box) family of transcription factors involved in the regulation of embryonic development and in the determination of the cell fate. The encoded protein may act as a transcriptional regulator after forming a protein complex with other proteins. The encoded protein may play a role in chondrogenesis. A pseudogene of this gene is located on chromosome 8. Multiple transcript variants encoding distinct isoforms have been identified for this gene.

Mutations in the SOX5 gene can cause Lamb-Shaffer syndrome.

== See also ==
- SOX genes
