= SOX30 =

Protein-coding gene in the species Homo sapiens

Identifiers
- Aliases: SOX30, SRY-box 30, SRY-box transcription factor 30
- External IDs: OMIM: 606698; MGI: 1341157; GeneCards: SOX30

Gene location (Human)
Chr.	Chromosome 5 (human)
Band	5q33.3	Start	157,625,679 bp
Band	5q33.3	End	157,671,480 bp

Gene location (Mouse)
Chr.	Chromosome 11 (mouse)
Band	11 B1.1|11 27.49 cM	Start	45,871,137 bp
Band	11 B1.1|11 27.49 cM	End	45,908,821 bp
RNA expression pattern
Bgee	Human / Mouse (ortholog); Top expressed in: left testis; right testis; secondary oocyte; testicle; gonad; sperm; mucosa of transverse colon; stromal cell of endometrium; islet of Langerhans; right uterine tube / Top expressed in: female urethra; spermatocyte; spermatid; seminiferous tubule; male urethra; embryo; retina; ovary; islet of Langerhans; urinary bladder; More reference expression data
BioGPS	n/a
Gene ontology
Molecular function	sequence-specific DNA binding; DNA binding; protein binding; DNA-binding transcription factor activity, RNA polymerase II-specific
Cellular component	nucleus
Biological process	response to corticosteroid; regulation of transcription, DNA-templated; transcription, DNA-templated; spermatogenesis; regulation of transcription by RNA polymerase II
Sources:Amigo / QuickGO
Orthologs
Databases	NCBI: entry; OMA: entry
Species	Human	Mouse
Entrez	11063	214105
Ensembl	ENSG00000039600	ENSMUSG00000040489
UniProt	O94993	Q8CGW4
RefSeq (mRNA)	NM_001308165; NM_007017; NM_178424	NM_173384
RefSeq (protein)	NP_001295094; NP_008948; NP_848511	NP_775560
Location (UCSC)	Chr 5: 157.63 – 157.67 Mb	Chr 11: 45.87 – 45.91 Mb
PubMed search
- Wikidata
View/Edit Human	View/Edit Mouse

SRY (sex determining region Y)-box 30 is a protein that in humans is encoded by the SOX30 gene.

== Function ==
This gene encodes a member of the SOX (SRY-related HMG-box) family of transcription factors involved in the regulation of embryonic development and in the determination of the cell fate. The encoded protein may act as a transcriptional regulator after forming a protein complex with other proteins. The protein may be involved in the differentiation of developing male germ cells. Alternative splicing results in multiple transcript variants. [provided by RefSeq, Jul 2013].
