= SOX14 =

Protein-coding gene in the species Homo sapiens

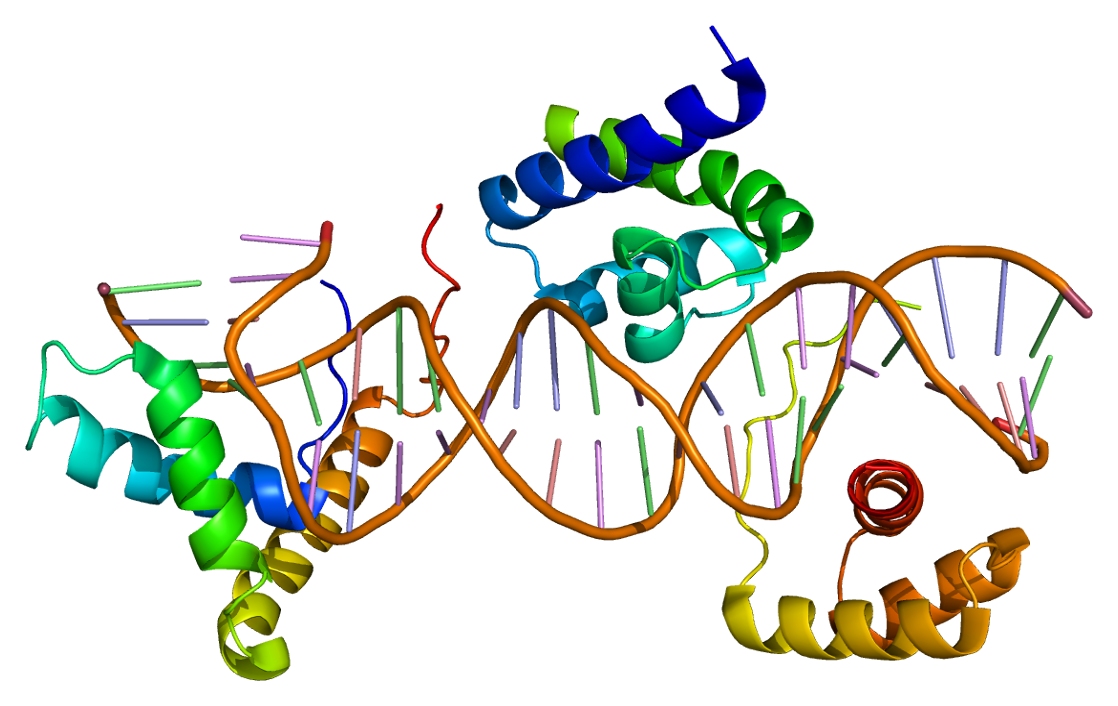

Identifiers
- Aliases: SOX14, SOX28, SRY-box 14, SRY-box transcription factor 14
- External IDs: OMIM: 604747; MGI: 98362; GeneCards: SOX14

Gene location (Human)
Chr.	Chromosome 3 (human)
Band	3q22.3	Start	137,764,315 bp
Band	3q22.3	End	137,766,334 bp

Gene location (Mouse)
Chr.	Chromosome 9 (mouse)
Band	9 E3.3|9 52.11 cM	Start	99,756,159 bp
Band	9 E3.3|9 52.11 cM	End	99,758,223 bp
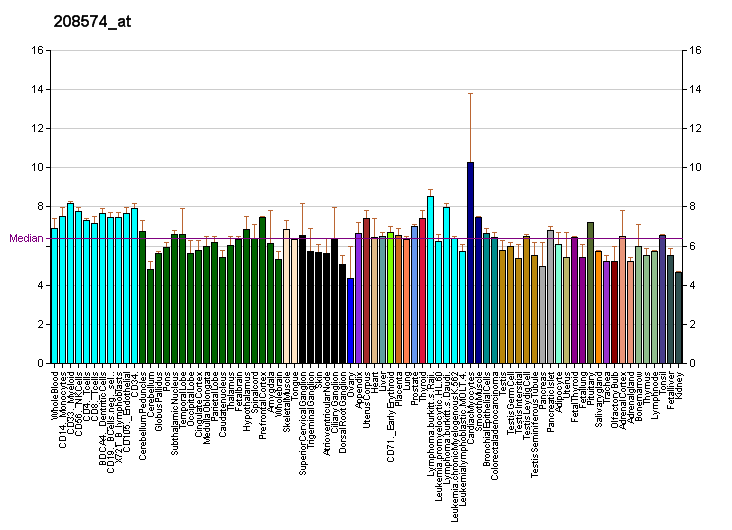
RNA expression pattern
Bgee	Human / Mouse (ortholog); Top expressed in: placenta; hypothalamus; substantia nigra; prostate; spinal cord; C1 segment / Top expressed in: urethra; male urethra; embryo; embryo; mesencephalon; genital tubercle; epiblast; rhombencephalon; cerebellar cortex; hypothalamus; More reference expression data
BioGPS	More reference expression data
Gene ontology
Molecular function	sequence-specific DNA binding; DNA binding; chromatin binding; protein binding; protein heterodimerization activity; DNA-binding transcription factor activity, RNA polymerase II-specific
Cellular component	nucleus; cellular component
Biological process	regulation of neuron migration; negative regulation of transcription, DNA-templated; regulation of transcription, DNA-templated; negative regulation of transcription by RNA polymerase II; transcription, DNA-templated; nervous system development; visual perception; entrainment of circadian clock; cell differentiation
Sources:Amigo / QuickGO
Orthologs
Databases	NCBI: entry; OMA: entry
Species	Human	Mouse
Entrez	8403	20669
Ensembl	ENSG00000168875	ENSMUSG00000053747
UniProt	O95416	Q04892
RefSeq (mRNA)	NM_004189	NM_011440
RefSeq (protein)	NP_004180	NP_035570
Location (UCSC)	Chr 3: 137.76 – 137.77 Mb	Chr 9: 99.76 – 99.76 Mb
PubMed search
- Wikidata
View/Edit Human	View/Edit Mouse

Transcription factor SOX-14 is a protein that in humans is encoded by the SOX14 gene.

== Function ==
This intronless gene encodes a member of the SOX (SRY-related HMG-box) family of transcription factors involved in the regulation of embryonic development and in the determination of the cell fate. The encoded protein may act as a transcriptional regulator after forming a protein complex with other proteins. Mutations in this gene are suggested to be responsible for the limb defects associated with blepharophimosis, ptosis, epicanthus inversus syndrome (BPES) and Mobius syndrome.
