= SoxC group =

SoxC group is group C of Sry-related HMG box proteins transcription factors. SoxC genes play an important role in determining the cell fate of neuronal mesenchymal progenitor cells in many developmental processes.

In Drosophila melanogaster (fly), Caenorhabditis elegans (worm), and other invertebrates SoxC is made up of only one member, but humans, mice and most other vertebrates have three members of the SoxC group. The three are Sox4, Sox11, and Sox12. These three are extremely similar to one another, more so than other proteins, but they are all highly distinct in the way that they bind DNA and active transcription in vitro with different affinity. The three found in humans and other vertebrates are single-exon genes. The SoxC proteins have 2 domains, the first an Sry-related HMG box DNA binding domain that is located near the N-terminal and the second a trans-activation domain, known as TAD, located near the C-terminal. Although these are transcription factors, to this date there is no evidence of post-translational modifications on SoxC members, but they can work cooperatively with other proteins though, such as transcription factors Brn2 and Brn1.

All of the SoxC proteins share 67% identity and 94% similarity in the 33 residues of the C-terminal domain. All SoxC genes show 84% identity and 95% similarity to one another in the HMG box, which is just slightly more highly conserved than the C-terminal domain. The SoxC proteins only have between 45% and 67% identity to Sry and the other Sox proteins. The SoxC genes found in the Drosophila melanogaster (fly), Caenorhabditis elegans (worm), and other lower animals are closely linked to those found in humans and other vertebrates. The SoxC genes are highly conserved through vertebrate evolution and are similar enough to those in invertebrates and other lower animal species to speculate that these are based on an evolutionary necessity from before vertebrates and invertebrates separated through evolution.

If these SoxC proteins were missing during developmental stages it would cause widespread problems through the body of mice, and in many cases death. These have not been studied in humans though, because no occurrences have been linked to congenital malformations of any of these proteins. In mice however, mice embryos without Sox4 die of heart defects, but mice newborns without Sox11 do live but have widespread defects. Mice without Sox12 are viable and show no outward signs of malformation. Some of the common human malformations are also seen in mice with mutated SoxC, such as cleft palate or heart outflow tract malformation. There is no evidence of the correlation between SoxC mutations in humans and these malformations, but there is speculation.

Sox4 facilitates differentiation of lymphocytes, osteoblasts, pancreatic beta cells and along with Sox11 promotes neural differentiation. In recent years, the belief has raised that SoxC genes may lead to tumor prognosis at elevated levels. Increased expression of Sox11 and Sox4 are seen in numerous tumors and cancers and it is possible that the tumors differ depending on the circumstance and primary transformation mechanism.
