= SOX6 =

Protein-coding gene in the species Homo sapiens

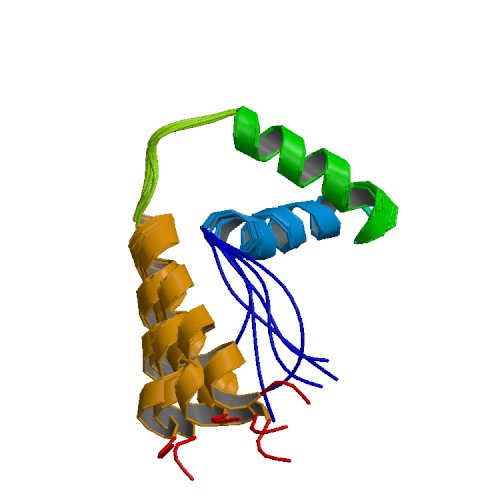

Identifiers
- Aliases: SOX6, HSSOXD, SRY-box 6, SRY-box transcription factor 6, TOLCAS
- External IDs: OMIM: 607257; MGI: 98368; GeneCards: SOX6

Gene location (Human)
Chr.	Chromosome 11 (human)
Band	11p15.2	Start	15,966,449 bp
Band	11p15.2	End	16,739,591 bp

Gene location (Mouse)
Chr.	Chromosome 7 (mouse)
Band	7 F1|7 61.29 cM	Start	115,470,872 bp
Band	7 F1|7 61.29 cM	End	116,038,796 bp
RNA expression pattern
Bgee	Human / Mouse (ortholog); Top expressed in: pancreatic epithelial cell; tibia; deltoid muscle; sperm; sural nerve; mucosa of ileum; tibialis anterior muscle; pancreatic ductal cell; ventricular zone; jejunal mucosa / Top expressed in: triceps brachii muscle; vastus lateralis muscle; fetal liver hematopoietic progenitor cell; temporal muscle; sternocleidomastoid muscle; muscle of thigh; knee joint; ventricular zone; medial ganglionic eminence; medial head of gastrocnemius muscle; More reference expression data
BioGPS	n/a
Gene ontology
Molecular function	DNA binding; sequence-specific DNA binding; DNA-binding transcription factor activity; protein binding; protein heterodimerization activity; RNA polymerase II cis-regulatory region sequence-specific DNA binding; DNA-binding transcription repressor activity, RNA polymerase II-specific; DNA-binding transcription factor activity, RNA polymerase II-specific
Cellular component	nucleoplasm; nucleus
Biological process	cellular response to transforming growth factor beta stimulus; cell fate commitment; regulation of transcription, DNA-templated; cardiac muscle cell differentiation; muscle organ development; oligodendrocyte differentiation; in utero embryonic development; negative regulation of transcription by RNA polymerase II; post-embryonic development; transcription, DNA-templated; positive regulation of mesenchymal stem cell differentiation; multicellular organism development; positive regulation of transcription, DNA-templated; oligodendrocyte cell fate specification; muscle cell differentiation; cartilage development; astrocyte differentiation; positive regulation of cartilage development; positive regulation of chondrocyte differentiation; cell morphogenesis; regulation of gene expression; erythrocyte differentiation; negative regulation of transcription, DNA-templated; positive regulation of transcription by RNA polymerase II; erythrocyte development; negative regulation of cardiac muscle cell differentiation; hemopoiesis
Sources:Amigo / QuickGO
Orthologs
Databases	NCBI: entry; OMA: entry
Species	Human	Mouse
Entrez	55553	20679
Ensembl	ENSG00000110693	ENSMUSG00000051910
UniProt	P35712	P40645
RefSeq (mRNA)	NM_033326; NM_001145811; NM_001145819; NM_017508; NM_001367872 NM_001367873	NM_001025559; NM_001025560; NM_001277326; NM_001277327; NM_001277328 NM_011445
RefSeq (protein)	NP_001139283; NP_001139291; NP_059978; NP_201583; NP_001354801 NP_001354802	NP_001020730; NP_001020731; NP_001264255; NP_001264256; NP_001264257 NP_035575
Location (UCSC)	Chr 11: 15.97 – 16.74 Mb	Chr 7: 115.47 – 116.04 Mb
PubMed search
- Wikidata
View/Edit Human	View/Edit Mouse

Transcription factor SOX-6 is a protein that in humans is encoded by the SOX6 gene.

== Function ==
The SOX gene family encodes a group of transcription factors defined by the conserved high mobility group (HMG) DNA-binding domain. Unlike most transcription factors, SOX transcription factors bind to the minor groove of DNA, causing a 70- to 85-degree bend and introducing local conformational changes.[supplied by OMIM]

== Interactions ==
SOX6 has been shown to interact with CTBP2 and CENPK.

It has also been demonstrated that SOX6 protein accumulates in the differentiating human erythrocytes, and then is able to downregulate its own transcription, by directly binding to an evolutionarily conserved consensus sequences located near SOX6 transcriptional start site.

Sox6 appears to have a crucial role in the transcriptional regulation of globin genes, and in directing the terminal differentiation of red blood cells. In addition, SOX6 may have a role in tumor growth of Ewing sarcoma. A new role of Sox6 in renin and prorenin regulation was studied using a Sox KO mouse model in which Sox6 is only knockout in renin expressing cells. This study showed that renin promoter possesses the binding site for Sox6. The highlight of the study was that Sox6 is one of the key regulators of renin and prorenin regulation and JG cell expansion during low salt and dehydration in mice. PMID 31760770; DOI: 10.1152/ajprenal.00095.2019

== See also ==
- SOX genes
