= SKA2 =

Protein found in humans

Identifiers
- Aliases: SKA2, FAM33A, spindle and kinetochore associated complex subunit 2
- External IDs: OMIM: 616674; MGI: 1913390; GeneCards: SKA2
Available structures
PDB	Ortholog search: PDBe RCSB
PDB	List of PDB id codes 4AJ5

Gene location (Human)
Chr.	Chromosome 17 (human)
Band	17q22	Start	59,109,857 bp
Band	17q22	End	59,155,260 bp

Gene location (Mouse)
Chr.	Chromosome 11 (mouse)
Band	11|11 C	Start	87,000,060 bp
Band	11|11 C	End	87,015,461 bp
RNA expression pattern
Bgee	Human / Mouse (ortholog); Top expressed in: ventricular zone; ganglionic eminence; endothelial cell; cerebellar vermis; corpus callosum; Achilles tendon; C1 segment; cerebellar hemisphere; medulla oblongata; pons / Top expressed in: Rostral migratory stream; ventricular zone; ganglionic eminence; maxillary prominence; mandibular prominence; yolk sac; atrium; medial ganglionic eminence; renal corpuscle; abdominal wall; More reference expression data
BioGPS	n/a
Gene ontology
Molecular function	microtubule binding; protein binding
Cellular component	cytoplasm; outer kinetochore; cytosol; spindle; spindle microtubule; chromosome, centromeric region; cytoskeleton; microtubule; kinetochore; chromosome
Biological process	chromosome segregation; cell cycle; regulation of microtubule polymerization or depolymerization; cell division; mitotic cell cycle
Sources:Amigo / QuickGO
Orthologs
Databases	NCBI: entry; OMA: entry
Species	Human	Mouse
Entrez	348235	66140
Ensembl	ENSG00000182628	ENSMUSG00000020492
UniProt	Q8WVK7	Q9CR46
RefSeq (mRNA)	NM_001100595; NM_182620; NM_001330399	NM_025377
RefSeq (protein)	NP_001094065; NP_001317328; NP_872426	NP_079653
Location (UCSC)	Chr 17: 59.11 – 59.16 Mb	Chr 11: 87 – 87.02 Mb
PubMed search
- Wikidata
View/Edit Human	View/Edit Mouse

Spindle and Kinetochore Associated Complex Subunit 2

Identifiers
- Symbol: SKA2
- Alt. names: Family with Sequence Similarity 33. Member A, FAM33A, Spindle and KT (Kinetochore) Associated 2, Protein FAM33A
- NCBI gene: 348235
- HGNC: 28006
- OMIM: 616674
- UniProt: Q8WVK7

Other data
- Locus: Chr. 17 q22
Search for
- Structures: Swiss-model
- Domains: InterPro

Spindle and kinetochore-associated protein 2 is a protein that in humans is encoded by the SKA2 gene found in chromosome 17. SKA2 is a part of a spindle and kinetochore associated complex also including SKA1 and SKA3 which is responsible for onset of the anaphase in mitosis by regulating chromosomal segregation.

SKA2 may function as a prognostic gene marker for identifying lung cancer as well as a proposed biomarker for suicidal tendencies and post-traumatic stress disorders. The SKA2 gene contains one single-nucleotide polymorphism (SNP) rs7208505 located in the 3' UTR. This genetic variant containing a cytosine (existing in the less common allele) instead of thymine along with epigenetic modification (such as DNA methylation) is correlated with suicidal tendencies and post-traumatic stress.

== Discovery ==
SKA2 protein was first documented as a product of as hypothetical gene FAM33A part of a Spindle and Kinetochore (KT)- associated complex necessary for timely anaphase onset. SKA2 was identified as the partner of SKA1, hence the name in 2006. Later on the 3rd component of the SKA complex was mass spectrometrically identified as C13Orf3 later referred to as SKA3. This complex plays an important role in the cell during mitotic transition from the metaphase to the anaphase.

== Protein structure and sub-cellular localization ==
SKA2 gene product is a 121 amino acid long chain and a molecular weight of 14,188 Da containing mainly 3 helices. Homologues of SKA2 protein being very small are found in several vertebrates but absent in invertebrates. This protein mainly localizes in the condensed chromosome and to the outer spindle and kinetochore microtubules during mitosis. The SKA2 proteins localizes to the mitotic spindle and kinetochore associated proteins such as SKA1 and SKA3.

== Function ==
The SKA2 is a part of the larger spindle and kinetochore complex which is a sub-complex of the outer kinetochore and binds to the microtubules. This complex is essential for the correctly timed onset of anaphase during mitosis by helping in the chromosomal segregation and aids in the movement of microspheres along a microtubule in a depolymerisation-coupled manner, since it is a direct component in the kinetochore-microtubule interface along with directly associating with the microtubules as assemblies.

A reduced expression of SKA2 results in the loss of the complex from the kinetochore, however this loss of SKA-complex does not affect the overall structure of the Kinetochore yet the fibres show increased cold-sensitivity due to the loss. The cell goes through a prolonged delay in a metaphase-like state. It has been concluded that SKA2 regulates the maintenance of the metaphase plate and silencing of the spindle checkpoint leading to the onset of anaphase during mitosis. SKA2 also interacts with the glucocorticoid receptor aiding in the chaperoning of the receptor in the nucleus.

== Clinical significance ==
=== Suicidal tendencies and post-traumatic stress disorder ===
The DNA methylation of SKA2 gene and the Single-nucleotide polymorphism rs7208505 genotype may have effects on suicidal behaviour according to linear model suggested by a study in 2014. The genotype rs7208505 contains a single nucleotide polymorphism (SNP) containing a Cytosine variant allele instead of Thymine present in the common allele. This SNP allows the dinucleotide repeat (CpG) elements to occur providing a gene segment for methylation. Thus DNA methylation alone may be the primary factor conferring risk of suicidal behaviour. A study of allele of rs7208505 in different ethnic groups along with numerous psychiatric diagnosis suggested that the variation in SKA2 may mediate risk for suicidal behaviours that progress to attempt to suicide.

=== Lung cancer ===
Early research suggests that SKA2 may play a role in lung cancer. SKA2 expression is upregulated in lung cancer, and high expression of the SKA2 gene is associated with worse lung cancer outcomes, especially when combined with high expression of the gene PRR11. This pair of genes are separated by a roughly 500 bp long intergenic region. Assays suggest that the transcription factor, NF-Y, binds to a particular 80 bp core inside of this region, which may act as a bidirectional promotor. A bidirectional promoter couples expression of 2 genes (protein coding) involved in the same biochemical process to allow a synchronized temporal or environmental control. Due to these connections, the genes SKA2 and PRR11 may have prognostic value for cancer patients. Like SKA2, PRR11 plays a major role in regulating cell cycle progression but instead during the late S phase to mitosis. Given their vital roles in cell cycle progression at different stages, SKA2 and PRR11 may act synergistically to affect lung cancer proliferation by causing a deregulation of cell cycle progression, though the underlying mechanism remains unclear. In addition to the protein coding mRNA, the transcription of the SKA2 gene produces 2 introns miRNA301a and miRNAA454, which may have a functional impact. These introns have been known to participate in tumorigenesis since miRNA301a regulates PTEN, NKRF, SMAD4 and PIAS3 and miRNAA454 targets SMAD4 playing an oncogenic role in human colon cancer.

== Interactions ==
- SKA1
- SKA3
- GR (Glucocorticoid receptor)
