= SOX18 =

Protein-coding gene in the species Homo sapiens

Identifiers
- Aliases: SOX18, HLTS, HLTRS, SRY-box 18, SRY-box transcription factor 18
- External IDs: OMIM: 601618; MGI: 103559; GeneCards: SOX18

Gene location (Human)
Chr.	Chromosome 20 (human)
Band	20q13.33	Start	64,047,582 bp
Band	20q13.33	End	64,049,639 bp

Gene location (Mouse)
Chr.	Chromosome 2 (mouse)
Band	2 H4|2 103.71 cM	Start	181,311,629 bp
Band	2 H4|2 103.71 cM	End	181,313,433 bp
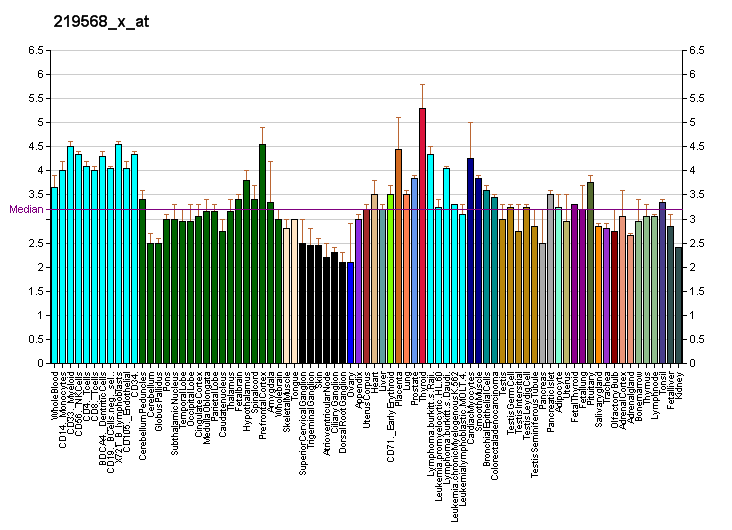
RNA expression pattern
Bgee	Human / Mouse (ortholog); Top expressed in: apex of heart; right lung; left uterine tube; right auricle of heart; right lobe of thyroid gland; left ventricle; right coronary artery; gastric mucosa; body of uterus; left coronary artery / Top expressed in: interventricular septum; glomerular capillary; right lung; endothelial cell of lymphatic vessel; left lung; right lung lobe; external carotid artery; left lung lobe; lactiferous gland; internal carotid artery; More reference expression data
BioGPS	More reference expression data
Gene ontology
Molecular function	DNA binding; sequence-specific DNA binding; DNA-binding transcription factor activity; DNA-binding transcription activator activity, RNA polymerase II-specific; RNA polymerase II cis-regulatory region sequence-specific DNA binding; protein heterodimerization activity; DNA-binding transcription factor activity, RNA polymerase II-specific
Cellular component	nucleus
Biological process	hair follicle development; establishment of endothelial barrier; hair cycle process; regulation of transcription, DNA-templated; stem cell fate specification; lymphangiogenesis; blood vessel endothelial cell migration; lymphatic endothelial cell differentiation; endocardium formation; outflow tract morphogenesis; mRNA transcription by RNA polymerase II; in utero embryonic development; negative regulation of transcription by RNA polymerase II; cell maturation; endocardial cell differentiation; lymph vessel development; transcription, DNA-templated; embryonic heart tube development; vasculogenesis; positive regulation of transcription, DNA-templated; heart looping; development of the heart; vasculature development; blood vessel development; angiogenesis; negative regulation of transcription, DNA-templated; regulation of stem cell proliferation; positive regulation of transcription by RNA polymerase II; cell differentiation
Sources:Amigo / QuickGO
Orthologs
Databases	NCBI: entry; OMA: entry
Species	Human	Mouse
Entrez	54345	20672
Ensembl	ENSG00000203883	ENSMUSG00000046470
UniProt	P35713	P43680
RefSeq (mRNA)	NM_018419	NM_009236
RefSeq (protein)	NP_060889	NP_033262
Location (UCSC)	Chr 20: 64.05 – 64.05 Mb	Chr 2: 181.31 – 181.31 Mb
PubMed search
- Wikidata
View/Edit Human	View/Edit Mouse

Transcription factor SOX-18 is a protein that in humans is encoded by the SOX18 gene.

== Function ==
This gene encodes a member of the SOX (SRY-related HMG-box) family of transcription factors involved in the regulation of embryonic development and in the determination of the cell fate. The encoded protein may act as a transcriptional regulator after forming a protein complex with other proteins. This protein plays a role in hair, blood vessel, and lymphatic vessel development. Mutations in this gene have been associated with recessive and dominant forms of hypotrichosis-lymphedema-telangiectasia (HLTS). An autosomal truncating dominant mutation in this gene has also been associated with renal failure in the condition hypotrichosis-lymphedema-telangiectasia-renal defect syndrome (HLTRS).

== Interactions ==
SOX18 has been shown to interact with:

MEF2C

RBPJ

== See also ==
- SOX genes
