= Transmembrane protein 217 =

Genetic protein

TMEM217

Identifiers
- Aliases: TMEM217, C6orf128, dJ355M6.2, transmembrane protein 217
- External IDs: MGI: 3646280; HomoloGene: 51671; GeneCards: TMEM217; OMA:TMEM217 - orthologs

Gene location (Mouse)
Chr.	Chromosome 17 (mouse)
Band	17|17 A3.3	Start	29,744,981 bp
Band	17|17 A3.3	End	29,771,359 bp
Orthologs
Species	Human	Mouse
Entrez	221468	71138
Ensembl	ENSG00000172738	ENSMUSG00000079580
UniProt	Q8N7C4	Q14AF1
RefSeq (mRNA)	NM_001162900; NM_001286401; NM_145316; NM_001371555; NM_001395238 NM_001395240; NM_001395241; NM_001395242; NM_001395243; NM_001395244	NM_001162901; NM_001162902
RefSeq (protein)	NP_001156372; NP_001273330; NP_660359	NP_001156373; NP_001156374
Location (UCSC)	n/a	Chr 17: 29.74 – 29.77 Mb
PubMed search
- Wikidata
View/Edit Human	View/Edit Mouse

Transmembrane Protein 217 is a protein encoded by the gene TMEM217. TMEM217 has been found to have expression correlated with the lymphatic system and endothelial tissues, and has been predicted to have a function linked to the cytoskeleton.

== Gene ==
TMEM217 is located on the chromosome 6 minus strand at 6p21.2. The gene consists of 46,857 base pairs and is flanked by TBC1D22B (TBC1 Domain Family Member 22B) and PIM1. It was previously known as C6orf128 (Chromosome 6 open reading frame 128).

== mRNA ==
TMEM217 has three common isoforms formed from the alternative splicing of three exons. Isoform 1 translates for the longest polypeptide, consisting of 1590 nucleotides. The 5’ un-translated region of isoform 1 is relatively short and is predicted to fold into several stem loop domains within conserved areas of the un-translated region.

== Protein ==
=== Primary protein sequence ===
The longest polypeptide of transmembrane protein 217 consists of 229 amino acids. This protein isoform has a predicted weight of 26.6 kDa and isoelectric point at a pH of 9.3. It is notably rich in isoleucine and phenylalanine, and deficient in alanine, aspartate, and proline compared to other proteins. Transmembrane protein 217 contains the domain of unknown function, DUF4534, between amino acids 11-171.

=== Secondary structure ===
Transmembrane protein 217 is predicted to have four transmembrane domains. These transmembrane domains consist primarily of uncharged amino acids in predicted alpha helices. The N-terminus and C-terminus of the protein are predicted to be facing the cytosol with the C-terminus containing a long predicted coiled tail extending from the final transmembrane domain.

=== Post-translational modifications ===
There are several predicted phosphorylation and glycosylation sites on transmembrane protein 217 in highly conserved parts of the protein, where the phosphorylation sites are located primarily on the C-terminal tail. There are also two highly conserved cysteine residues, which have the potential to form a disulfide bond in the extracellular space between the first and second transmembrane domains.

The image depicts a conceptual diagram of transmembrane protein 217. The protein is given from N-terminus to C-terminus with predicted cellular, transmembrane and extracellular domains present (colored blue, grey, and orange respectively). The most highly conserved predicted post-translational modifications are provided as well. The following predicted post-translational modifications are provided: phosphorylation sites, disulfide bond, and a C-linked mannosylation.

== Expression ==
TMEM217 is not ubiquitously expressed. The gene tends to have expression correlated to lymphatic system, vascular/arterial endothelial tissue, and notable expression in the bladder based on expression profiles and microarray analysis. Other tissues that have been shown to express TMEM217 include: connective tissues, the liver, mammary glands, the testis, and the cervix. Co-expression analyses have found that TMEM217 was up-regulated in response to mechanical stretch in dermal fibroblast cells and in response to the resveratrol derivative, DMU-212, in vascular endothelial tissues.

== Function ==
No known function has been attributed to TMEM217, however a co-expression analysis in dermal fibroblasts has predicted the protein to have a potential association with the cytoskeleton.

== Clinical significance ==
Single nucleotide polymorphisms in TMEM217 have been linked to Alzheimer’s disease and diabetic retinopathy. TMEM217 was also found to have similar expression patterns as TRPM2, a biomarker linked to breast carcinoma. Expression profiles have also linked elevated TMEM217 expression to bladder cancer and lymphoma.

== Homology ==
TMEM217 was found to have orthologs in organisms as early as the scaled fish, which diverged 420 million years ago. Although found in organisms as early as fish and reptiles, TMEM217 has no known orthologs in any bird species.

TMEM217 has no known paralogs.
