= SOX11 =

Protein-coding gene in the species Homo sapiens

Identifiers
- Aliases: SOX11, MRD27, SRY-box 11, CSS9, SRY-box transcription factor 11
- External IDs: OMIM: 600898; MGI: 98359; GeneCards: SOX11

Gene location (Human)
Chr.	Chromosome 2 (human)
Band	2p25.2	Start	5,692,384 bp
Band	2p25.2	End	5,701,385 bp

Gene location (Mouse)
Chr.	Chromosome 12 (mouse)
Band	12|12 A2	Start	27,384,263 bp
Band	12|12 A2	End	27,392,573 bp
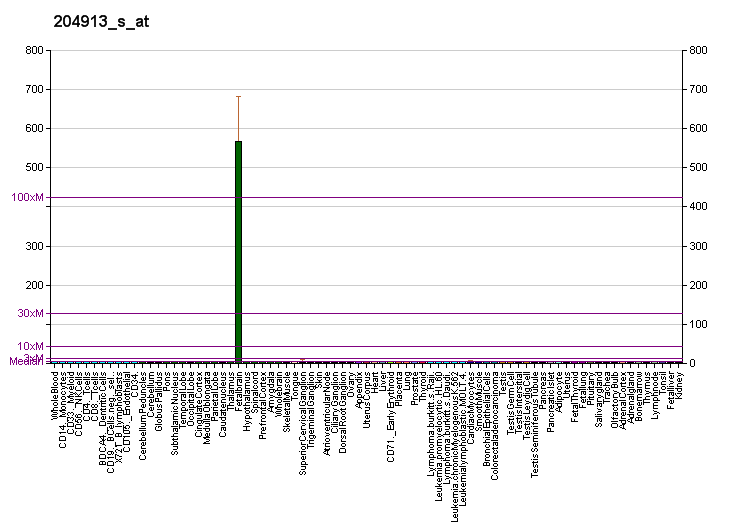

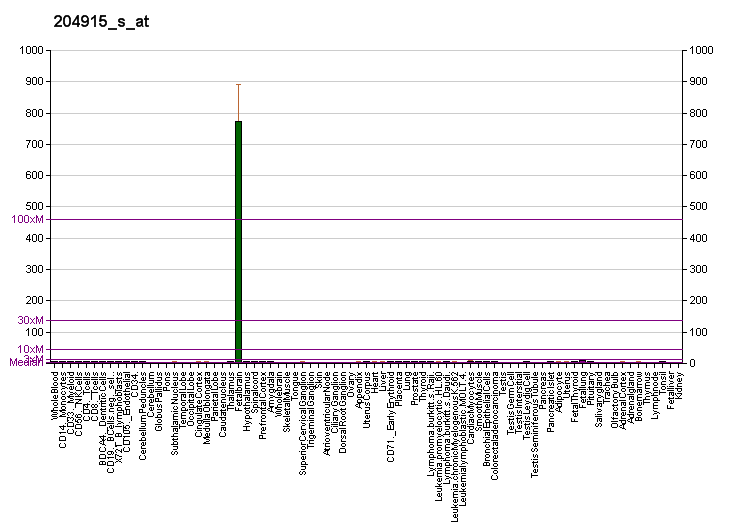

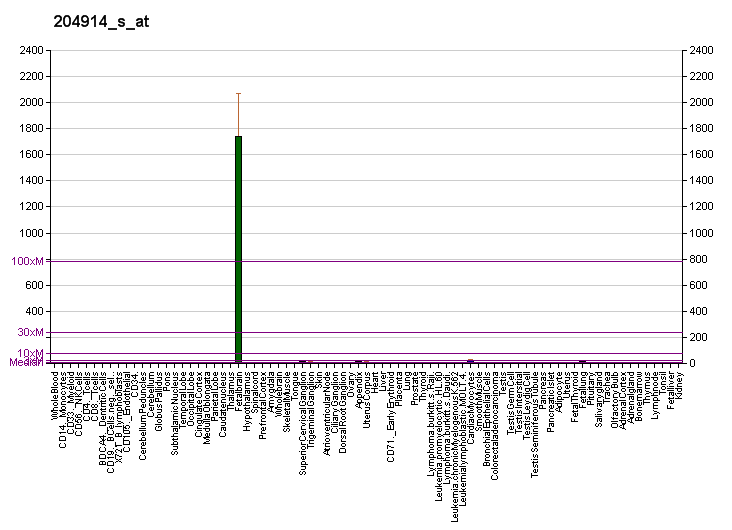
RNA expression pattern
Bgee	Human / Mouse (ortholog); Top expressed in: ganglionic eminence; ventricular zone; buccal mucosa cell; cartilage tissue; optic nerve; retinal pigment epithelium; internal globus pallidus; nucleus accumbens; hypothalamus; medulla oblongata / Top expressed in: Rostral migratory stream; medial ganglionic eminence; abdominal wall; maxillary prominence; genital tubercle; human fetus; mandibular prominence; fossa; otic vesicle; trigeminal ganglion; More reference expression data
BioGPS	More reference expression data
Gene ontology
Molecular function	DNA binding; transcription coactivator activity; DNA-binding transcription factor activity; DNA-binding transcription activator activity, RNA polymerase II-specific; translation factor activity, RNA binding; transcription cis-regulatory region binding; cis-regulatory region sequence-specific DNA binding; RNA polymerase II core promoter sequence-specific DNA binding; DNA-binding transcription factor activity, RNA polymerase II-specific; RNA polymerase II cis-regulatory region sequence-specific DNA binding
Cellular component	cytoplasm; nucleus
Biological process	embryonic skeletal system morphogenesis; skeletal system development; noradrenergic neuron differentiation; positive regulation of lens epithelial cell proliferation; cell differentiation; cardiac ventricle formation; glial cell development; regulation of transcription, DNA-templated; limb bud formation; lung morphogenesis; sympathetic nervous system development; neural crest cell development; kidney development; negative regulation of glial cell proliferation; soft palate development; ventricular septum morphogenesis; cornea development in camera-type eye; outflow tract morphogenesis; positive regulation of ossification; negative regulation of transcription by RNA polymerase II; negative regulation of cell death; transcription by RNA polymerase II; eyelid development in camera-type eye; negative regulation of gene expression; negative regulation of lymphocyte proliferation; somite development; transcription, DNA-templated; neuroepithelial cell differentiation; regulation of transforming growth factor beta receptor signaling pathway; nervous system development; positive regulation of transcription, DNA-templated; positive regulation of hippo signaling; positive regulation of neurogenesis; multicellular organism development; positive regulation of gene expression; positive regulation of osteoblast differentiation; lens morphogenesis in camera-type eye; negative regulation of transcription regulatory region DNA binding; hard palate development; positive regulation of neuron differentiation; neuron differentiation; positive regulation of cell population proliferation; spinal cord development; positive regulation of BMP signaling pathway; glial cell proliferation; skeletal muscle cell differentiation; embryonic digestive tract morphogenesis; oligodendrocyte development; cell population proliferation; positive regulation of stem cell proliferation; neural tube formation; positive regulation of hormone secretion; positive regulation of transcription by RNA polymerase II; closure of optic fissure; protein biosynthesis
Sources:Amigo / QuickGO
Orthologs
Databases	NCBI: entry; OMA: entry
Species	Human	Mouse
Entrez	6664	20666
Ensembl	ENSG00000176887	ENSMUSG00000063632
UniProt	P35716	Q7M6Y2
RefSeq (mRNA)	NM_003108	NM_009234
RefSeq (protein)	NP_003099	NP_033260
Location (UCSC)	Chr 2: 5.69 – 5.7 Mb	Chr 12: 27.38 – 27.39 Mb
PubMed search
- Wikidata
View/Edit Human	View/Edit Mouse

Transcription factor SOX-11 is a protein that in humans is encoded by the SOX11 gene.

== Function ==
This intronless gene encodes a member of the group C SOX (SRY-related HMG-box) transcription factor family involved in the regulation of embryonic development and in the determination of the cell fate. The encoded protein may act as a transcriptional regulator after forming a protein complex with other proteins. The protein may function in the developing nervous system and play a role in tumorigenesis and adult neurogenesis. Tuj1 and Tead2 are suggested as direct target of Sox11.

== Clinical aspect ==
Lymphocyte staining for SOX11 immunohistochemistry indicates mantle cell lymphoma (cyclin D1 positive and negative) rather than other mature lymphoid neoplasms or normal lymphocytes.

Mutations in SOX11 are associated with Coffin–Siris syndrome and mantle cell lymphoma.

== See also ==
- SOX genes
