= SOX17 =

Protein-coding gene in the species Homo sapiens

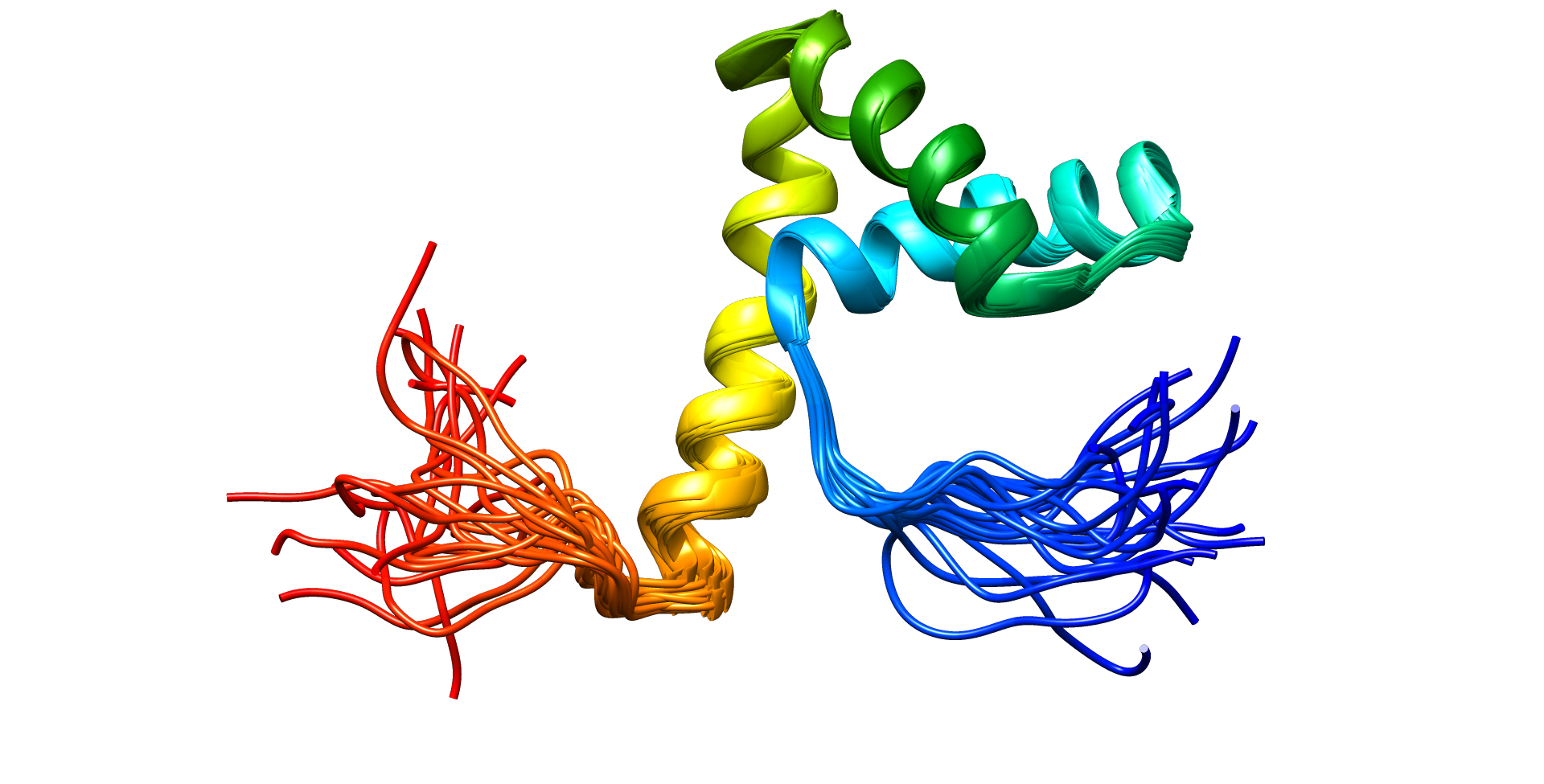

Identifiers
- Aliases: SOX17, VUR3, SRY-box 17, SRY-box transcription factor 17
- External IDs: OMIM: 610928; MGI: 107543; GeneCards: SOX17
Available structures
PDB	Ortholog search: PDBe RCSB
PDB	List of PDB id codes 2YUL, 4A3N

Gene location (Human)
Chr.	Chromosome 8 (human)
Band	8q11.23	Start	54,457,935 bp
Band	8q11.23	End	54,460,892 bp

Gene location (Mouse)
Chr.	Chromosome 1 (mouse)
Band	1 A1|1 1.65 cM	Start	4,561,154 bp
Band	1 A1|1 1.65 cM	End	4,567,577 bp
RNA expression pattern
Bgee	Human / Mouse (ortholog); Top expressed in: endothelial cell; pericardium; endometrium; right uterine tube; vena cava; gonad; left uterine tube; tibial nerve; subcutaneous adipose tissue; muscle of thigh / Top expressed in: left lung lobe; gastrula; external carotid artery; primitive streak; internal carotid artery; right lung; right lung lobe; uterus; carotid body; substantia nigra; More reference expression data
BioGPS	n/a
Gene ontology
Molecular function	sequence-specific DNA binding; DNA binding; beta-catenin binding; DNA-binding transcription factor activity; DNA-binding transcription activator activity, RNA polymerase II-specific; transcription coactivator activity; transcription factor binding; protein binding; protein heterodimerization activity; transcription factor activity, RNA polymerase II distal enhancer sequence-specific binding; DNA-binding transcription factor activity, RNA polymerase II-specific
Cellular component	transcription regulator complex; nucleoplasm; nucleus
Biological process	renal system development; endoderm development; regulation of embryonic development; regulation of transcription, DNA-templated; positive regulation of protein catabolic process; stem cell fate specification; positive regulation of skeletal muscle tissue development; embryonic foregut morphogenesis; embryonic organ development; endodermal digestive tract morphogenesis; negative regulation of mesodermal cell fate specification; inner cell mass cellular morphogenesis; negative regulation of Wnt signaling pathway; protein stabilization; endocardium formation; outflow tract morphogenesis; signal transduction involved in regulation of gene expression; endodermal cell fate determination; mRNA transcription by RNA polymerase II; regulation of mesodermal cell fate specification; negative regulation of transcription by RNA polymerase II; Wnt signaling pathway; endocardial cell differentiation; regulation of cardiac cell fate specification; transcription, DNA-templated; stem cell differentiation; embryonic heart tube development; vasculogenesis; positive regulation of transcription, DNA-templated; heart looping; cardiac cell fate determination; common bile duct development; negative regulation of Wnt signaling pathway involved in heart development; rostrocaudal neural tube patterning; positive regulation of gene expression; cardiogenic plate morphogenesis; heart formation; embryonic heart tube morphogenesis; negative regulation of cell growth; protein destabilization; angiogenesis; spermatogenesis; positive regulation of cell differentiation; regulation of stem cell division; gastrulation; gall bladder development; canonical Wnt signaling pathway; regulation of cell differentiation; cell migration involved in gastrulation; endoderm formation; regulation of stem cell proliferation; negative regulation of canonical Wnt signaling pathway; positive regulation of transcription by RNA polymerase II; cellular response to leukemia inhibitory factor; cell differentiation
Sources:Amigo / QuickGO
Orthologs
Databases	NCBI: entry; OMA: entry
Species	Human	Mouse
Entrez	64321	20671
Ensembl	ENSG00000164736	ENSMUSG00000025902
UniProt	Q9H6I2	Q61473
RefSeq (mRNA)	NM_022454	NM_001289464; NM_001289465; NM_001289466; NM_001289467; NM_011441
RefSeq (protein)	NP_071899	NP_001276393; NP_001276394; NP_001276395; NP_001276396; NP_035571
Location (UCSC)	Chr 8: 54.46 – 54.46 Mb	Chr 1: 4.56 – 4.57 Mb
PubMed search
- Wikidata
View/Edit Human	View/Edit Mouse

SRY-box 17 is a protein that in humans is encoded by the SOX17 gene.

== Gene ==
The gene encodes a member of the SOX (SRY-related HMG-box) family of transcription factors, located on Chromosome 8 q11.23.

== Structure ==
The SOX17 gene sits inside a DNA loop that isolates it from control regions of surrounding DNA limiting which control regions can regulate the expression of SOX17. Approximately 230 kb upstream of SOX17 it has been identified a tissue specific differentially (hypo-)methylated region (DMR), which consists of SOX17 regulatory elements.

The DMR in particular bears the most distal definitive endoderm-specific enhancer at the SOX17 locus. SOX17 itself has recently been defined as so called topologically insulated gene (TIG). TIGs per definition are single protein coding genes (PCGs) within CTCF loop domains, that are mainly enriched in developmental regulators and suggested to be very tightly controlled via their 3D loop-domain architecture.

== Function ==
SOX17 is involved in the regulation of vertebrate embryonic development and in the determination of the endodermal cell fate. The encoded protein acts downstream of TGF beta signaling (Activin) and canonical WNT signaling (Wnt3a). Especially the correct phosphorylation of SMAD2/3 within the respective cell cycle (early G1 phase) is crucial for the activation of cardinal endodermal genes (e.g. SOX17) to further enter the definitive endodermal lineage. Besides that, perturbation of the SOX17 centromertic CTCF-boundary in early definitive endoderm differentiation, leads to massive developmental failure and a so-called mes-endodermal like trapped cell-state, which can be rescued by ectopic SOX17 expression. In Xenopus gastrulae it has been shown that SOX17 modifies Wnt responses, where genomic specificity of Wnt/β-catenin transcription is determined through functional interactions between SOX17 and β-catenin/Tcf transcriptional complexes.
