= SOX3 =

Protein-coding gene in the species Homo sapiens

Identifiers
- Aliases: SOX3, GHDX, MRGH, PHP, PHPX, SOXB, SRY-box 3, SRY-box transcription factor 3
- External IDs: OMIM: 313430; MGI: 98365; GeneCards: SOX3

Gene location (Human)
Chr.	X chromosome (human)
Band	Xq27.1	Start	140,502,985 bp
Band	Xq27.1	End	140,505,069 bp

Gene location (Mouse)
Chr.	X chromosome (mouse)
Band	X A6|X 33.66 cM	Start	59,934,972 bp
Band	X A6|X 33.66 cM	End	59,937,036 bp
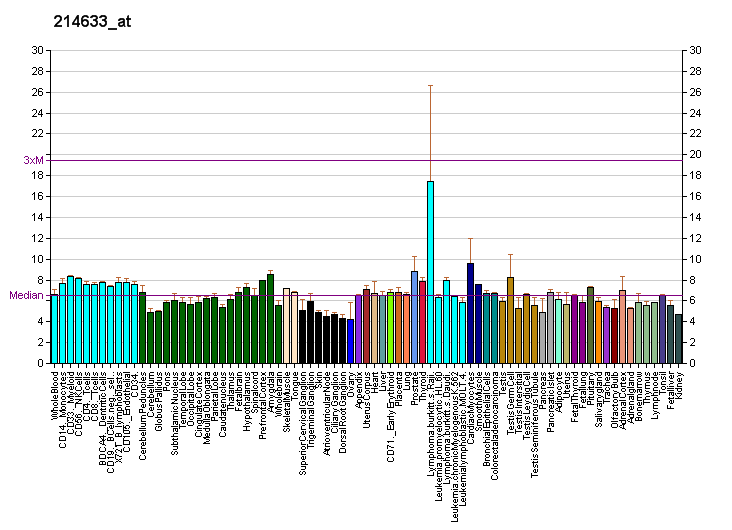
RNA expression pattern
Bgee	Human / Mouse (ortholog); Top expressed in: ventricular zone; ganglionic eminence; right uterine tube; secondary oocyte; hypothalamus; amygdala; anterior pituitary; nucleus accumbens; C1 segment; anterior cingulate cortex / Top expressed in: ventricular zone; somite; epiblast; suprachiasmatic nucleus; medial ganglionic eminence; Ileal epithelium; primitive streak; nasal placode; optic vesicle; lumbar spinal ganglion; More reference expression data
BioGPS	More reference expression data
Gene ontology
Molecular function	DNA binding; transcription corepressor activity; RNA polymerase II core promoter sequence-specific DNA binding; DNA-binding transcription factor activity, RNA polymerase II-specific
Cellular component	nucleus; nucleoplasm
Biological process	multicellular organism development; sensory organ development; central nervous system development; face development; pituitary gland development; regulation of transcription, DNA-templated; negative regulation of neuron differentiation; transcription, DNA-templated; hypothalamus development; negative regulation of transcription by RNA polymerase II; sex-determination system; negative regulation of nucleic acid-templated transcription; regulation of transcription by RNA polymerase II; cell differentiation; neuron differentiation
Sources:Amigo / QuickGO
Orthologs
Databases	NCBI: entry; OMA: entry
Species	Human	Mouse
Entrez	6658	20675
Ensembl	ENSG00000134595	ENSMUSG00000045179
UniProt	P41225	P53784
RefSeq (mRNA)	NM_005634	NM_009237
RefSeq (protein)	NP_005625	n/a
Location (UCSC)	Chr X: 140.5 – 140.51 Mb	Chr X: 59.93 – 59.94 Mb
PubMed search
- Wikidata
View/Edit Human	View/Edit Mouse

Transcription factor SOX-3 is a protein that in humans is encoded by the SOX3 gene. This gene encodes a member of the SOX (SRY-related HMG-box) family of transcription factors involved in the regulation of embryonic brain development and in determination of cell fate. The encoded protein acts as a transcriptional activator.

Mutations in this gene have been associated with X-linked hypopituitarism (XH) and X-linked intellectual disability. Patients with XH are male, have short stature, exhibit a mild form of intellectual disability and present pan-hypopituitarism. A duplication of the SOX3 gene has also been discovered to cause XX male sex reversal.

SRY-box transcription factor 3, SOX3, is a transcription factor that is encoded by the SOX3 gene. This gene is responsible for ensuring proper embryonic development and determining the fate of different cells. Regarding its developmental facet, SOX3, alongside other SOX transcription factors, ensures the proper formation of the hypothalamo-pituitary axis. The proper development of the hypothalamo-pituitary axis is necessary as it serves to ensure proper systemic hormonal function. When SOX3 expression is affected, the development of different structures can be affected as well. Specifically, both the hypothalamus and the pituitary gland can suffer in accomplishing proper growth. Due to this, conditions such as hypopituitarism and intellectual disability are found in cases with a lack of SOX3. Also, craniofacial abnormalities can be seen as a result of a lack of the SOX3 gene. To aid in the further understanding of the SOX3 gene, mice have been used as knockout models to study the effects of the gene’s absence.

== Function ==
SOX3 belongs to the family of SRY-related HMG-box containing genes which behave as transcription factors. SOX3 has been found to be involved in the regulation of embryonic brain development, the determination of cell fate and in XX male sex reversal.

SOX3 contains a single exon and is found in a highly conserved region of the X chromosome. The SOX3 gene shares some conservation with the SRY gene, and encodes a protein that is similar, sharing 67% amino acid identity across the DNA-binding HMG domain. This has led to the hypothesis that the SRY gene arose from SOX3 through a gain of function mutation within the proto-Y chromosome. Evidence to support this hypothesis arose from the discovery of a rare human case of XX sex reversal, that is thought to have occurred through a de novo duplication of the SOX3 gene. Such a duplication is thought to result in a gain of function expression of SOX3 in the genital ridge of the developing embryo leading to XX male sex reversal.

== See also ==
- SOX gene family
