= Coffin–Siris syndrome =

- Other names: Dwarfism-onychodysplasia, fifth digit syndrome, mental retardation with hypoplastic 5th fingernails and toenails, short stature-onychodysplasia
- Coffin–Siris syndrome is inherited in an autosomal dominant manner
- Frequency: 0.0001%

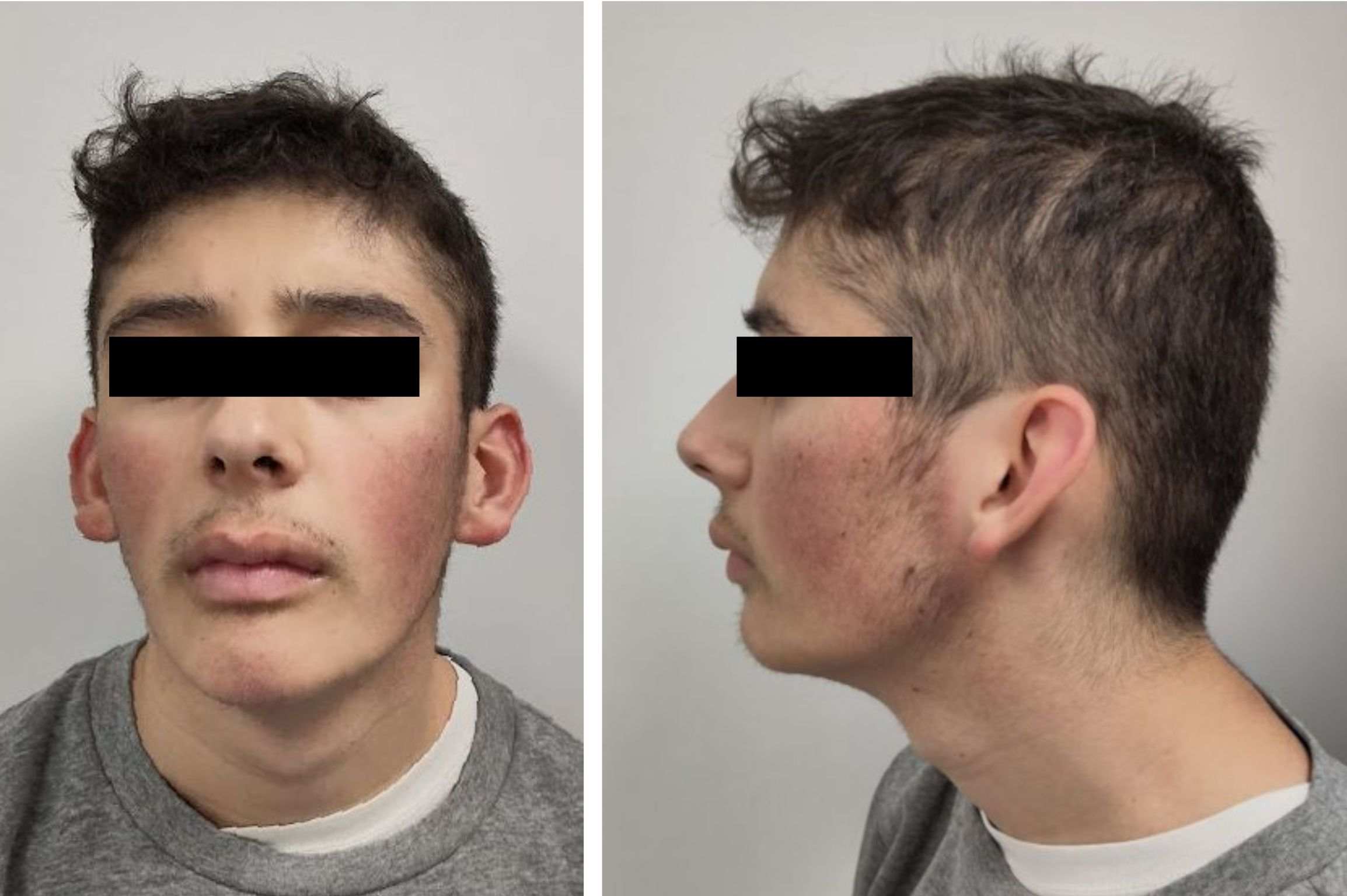
Coffin-Siris syndrome. 16-year-old boy with mutations in the ARID1B gene.

Coffin–Siris syndrome (CSS), first described in 1970 by Dr Grange S. Coffin and Dr E. Siris, is a rare genetic disorder that causes developmental delays and absent fifth finger and toe nails. There had been 31 reported cases by 1991. The number of occurrences since then has grown and is now reported to be around 250-550 individuals .

The differential includes Nicolaides–Baraitser syndrome.

== Presentation ==
- mild to moderate to severe intellectual disability, also called "developmental disability"
- short fifth digits with hypoplastic or absent nails
- low birth weight
- feeding difficulties upon birth
- frequent respiratory infections during infancy
- hypotonia
- joint laxity
- delayed bone age
- microcephaly
- coarse facial features, including wide nose, wide mouth, and thick eyebrows and lashes

== Causes ==
Disease can be inherited as an autosomal dominant trait, however most cases of CSS appear to be the result of a de novo mutation.

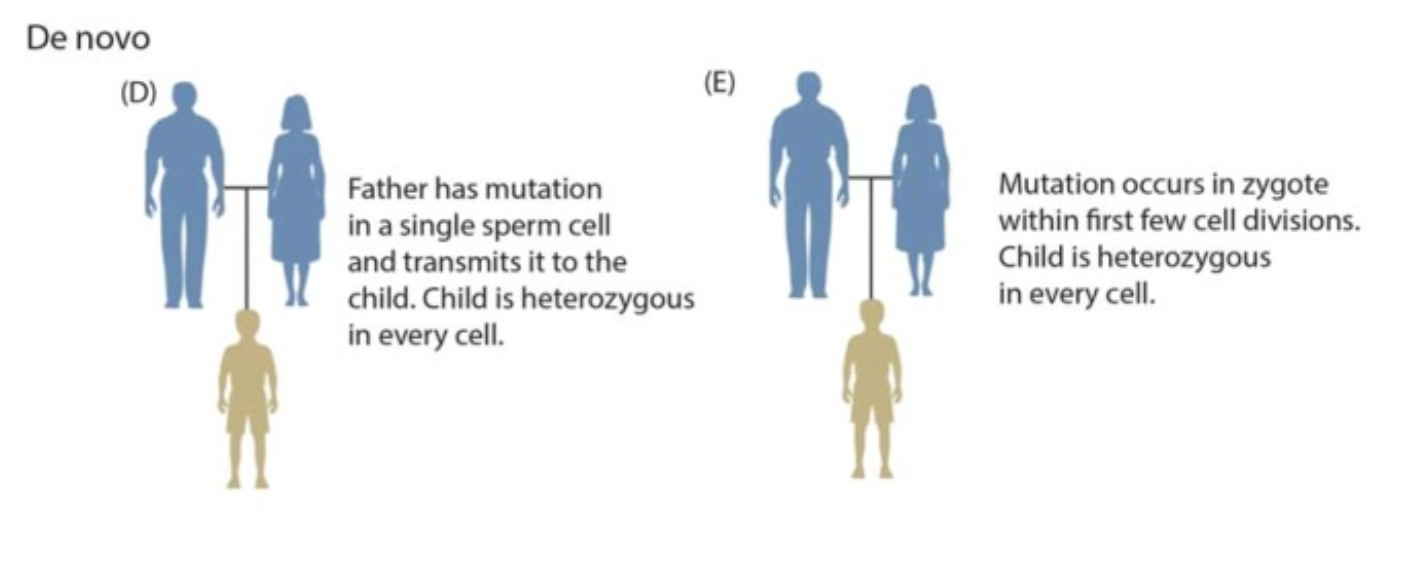
Transmittance of a de novo mutation in germ cells to offspring.

This syndrome has been associated with mutations in the ARID1B gene, which is the most prevalent in CSS.

There are also multiple genes mutations associated to this syndrome, including SOX11, ARID2, DPF2, PHF6, SMARCA2, SMARCA4, SMARCB1, SMARCC2, SMARCE1, SOX4.

The diagnosis is generally based on the presence of major and at least one minor clinical sign and can be confirmed by molecular genetic testing of the causative genes. Recent studies revealed that fifth finger nail/distal phalanx hypoplasia or aplasia is not a mandatory finding.

Typically, lab work will be done to rule out other conditions and genetic testing will also be performed to get the official diagnosis.

== Treatment ==
There is no known cure or standard for treatment. Treatment is based on symptoms and may include physical, occupational and speech therapy and educational services as well.
