= Camibirstat =

Clinical data
- Other names: FHD286

Identifiers
- IUPAC name: N-[(2S)-1-[[4-[6-[(2R,6S)-2,6-dimethylmorpholin-4-yl]pyridin-2-yl]-1,3-thiazol-2-yl]amino]-3-methoxy-1-oxopropan-2-yl]-1-methylsulfonylpyrrole-3-carboxamide
- CAS Number: 2671128-05-3
- PubChem CID: 156818030
- ChemSpider: 115010237
- UNII: QHA5XLA4SA
- ChEMBL: ChEMBL5095181

Chemical and physical data
- Formula: C_{24}H_{30}N_{6}O_{6}S_{2}
- Molar mass: 562.66 g·mol^{−1}
- 3D model (JSmol): Interactive image
- SMILES: C[C@@H]1CN(C[C@@H](O1)C)C2=CC=CC(=N2)C3=CSC(=N3)NC(=O)[C@H](COC)NC(=O)C4=CN(C=C4)S(=O)(=O)C
- InChI: InChI=InChI=1S/C24H30N6O6S2/c1-15-10-29(11-16(2)36-15)21-7-5-6-18(25-21)20-14-37-24(27-20)28-23(32)19(13-35-3)26-22(31)17-8-9-30(12-17)38(4,33)34/h5-9,12,14-16,19H,10-11,13H2,1-4H3,(H,26,31)(H,27,28,32)/t15-,16+,19-/m0/s1; Key:JBLQNFBXKOAIHG-FCEWJHQRSA-N

Camibirstat is an investigational new drug that is being evaluated for the treatment of cancer. It is a small molecule that acts as a selective inhibitor of SMARCA2 and SMARCA4, which are key components of the SWI/SNF chromatin remodeling complex.

It is being developed by Foghorn Therapeutics.
