= Nicolaides–Baraitser syndrome =

Nicolaides-Baraitser syndrome - NCBRS
- Other names: NCBRS
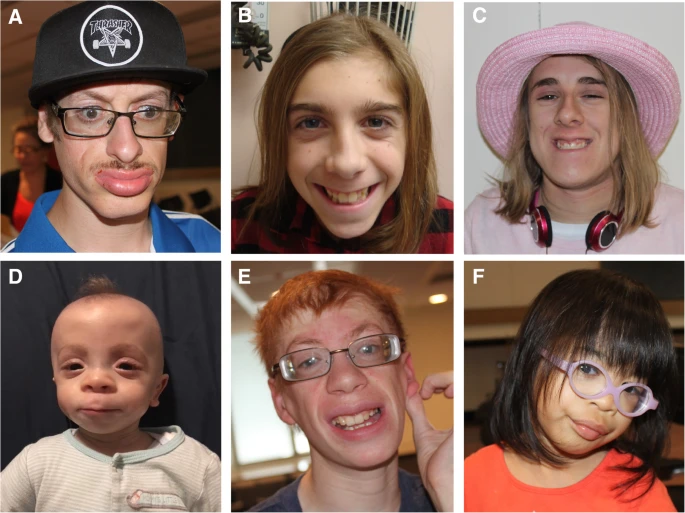
- This photo shows typical facial features of Nicolaides-Baraitser syndrome: coarse facies, dense eyebrows, enlarged mandible, and drooping lower lip.
- Frequency: <1 / 1 000 000

Nicolaides–Baraitser syndrome (NCBRS) is a rare genetic condition caused by de novo missense mutations in the SMARCA2 gene and has only been reported in fewer than 330 cases worldwide. NCBRS is a distinct condition and well recognizable once the symptoms have been identified.

Another condition associated with changes in the SMARCA2 gene is Coffin–Siris syndrome.

== Symptoms ==
The most common symptoms of Nicolaides–Baraitser syndrome are mild to severe developmental delays with absent or limited speech, seizures, short stature, sparse hair, typical facial characteristics, brachydactyly, and prominent finger joints and broad distal phalanges.

=== Major Features of NCBRS ===
- Mild prenatal growth retardation
- Moderate postnatal growth retardation
- Mild to severe developmental delay
- Severely impaired speech
- Seizures
- Microcephaly
- Sparse hair
- Progressive skin wrinkling
- Thick, anteverted alae nasi
- Long and broad philtrum
- Large mouth
- Thin upper and thick lower vermilion
- Progressive prominence of distal phalanges
- Progressive prominence of inter-phalangeal joints
- Scoliosis
- Short metacarpals–metatarsals

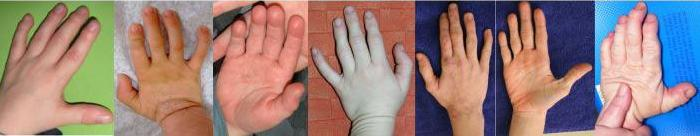
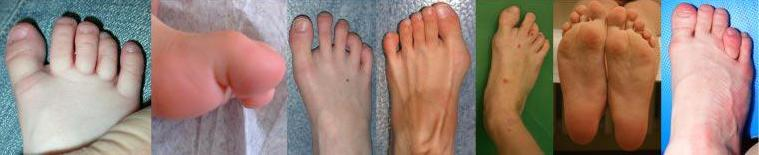

== Cause ==
This condition occurs via mutations in the SMARCA2 gene. In rare instances this condition can occur via a mutation in the ARID1B gene.

== History ==
Paola Nicolaides was a pediatric neurologist and Michael Baraitser a clinical geneticist, both working in Great Ormond Street Hospital for Children in London. They saw a young girl with an unusual combination of signs and symptoms, and thought this to be a recognizable entity. They published this in a medical journal in 1993. Other authors later suggested to name the entity after the authors who had first described it.
