= ING3 =

Protein-coding gene in the species Homo sapiens

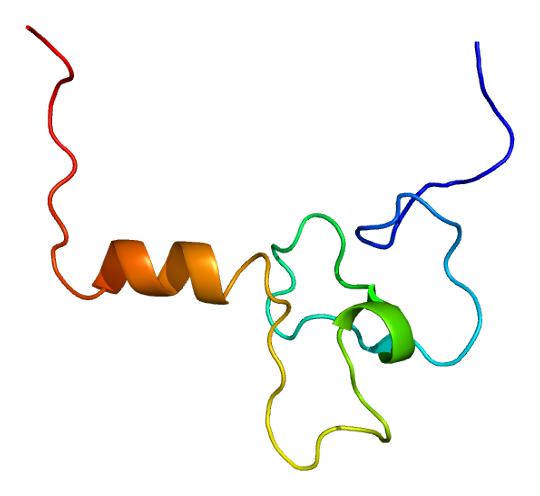

Identifiers
- Aliases: ING3, Eaf4, ING2, MEAF4, p47inhibitor of growth family member 3
- External IDs: OMIM: 607493; MGI: 1919027; GeneCards: ING3
Available structures
PDB	Ortholog search: PDBe RCSB
PDB	List of PDB id codes 1X4I

Gene location (Human)
Chr.	Chromosome 7 (human)
Band	7q31.31	Start	120,950,763 bp
Band	7q31.31	End	120,977,216 bp

Gene location (Mouse)
Chr.	Chromosome 6 (mouse)
Band	6|6 A3.1	Start	21,949,570 bp
Band	6|6 A3.1	End	21,976,037 bp
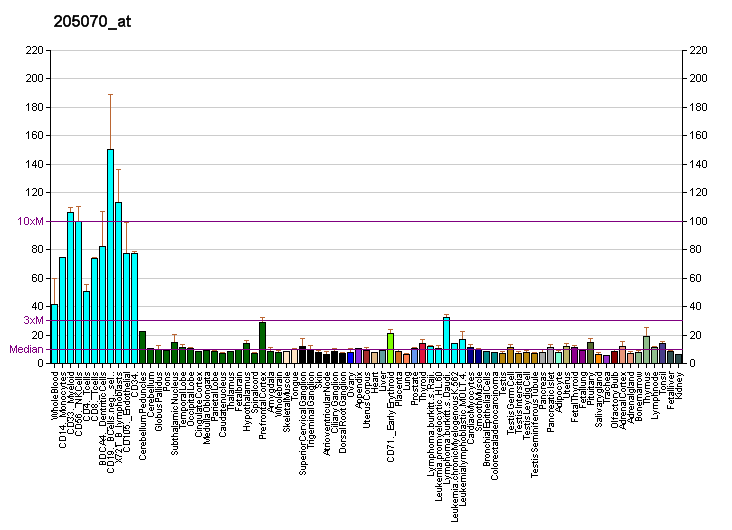
RNA expression pattern
Bgee	Human / Mouse (ortholog); Top expressed in: secondary oocyte; trabecular bone; monocyte; testicle; Achilles tendon; bone marrow; tail of epididymis; gonad; germinal epithelium; parietal pleura / Top expressed in: zygote; secondary oocyte; genital tubercle; tail of embryo; spermatid; granulocyte; primary oocyte; Rostral migratory stream; medial ganglionic eminence; ventricular zone; More reference expression data
BioGPS	More reference expression data
Gene ontology
Molecular function	histone acetyltransferase activity; methylated histone binding; metal ion binding
Cellular component	Piccolo NuA4 histone acetyltransferase complex; nucleus; nucleoplasm; Swr1 complex; NuA4 histone acetyltransferase complex
Biological process	histone H4 acetylation; histone H2A acetylation; regulation of growth; regulation of transcription, DNA-templated; transcription, DNA-templated; positive regulation of apoptotic process; chromatin organization
Sources:Amigo / QuickGO
Orthologs
Databases	NCBI: entry; OMA: entry
Species	Human	Mouse
Entrez	54556	71777
Ensembl	ENSG00000071243	ENSMUSG00000029670
UniProt	Q9NXR8	Q8VEK6
RefSeq (mRNA)	NM_198267; NM_019071; NM_198266	NM_023626; NM_001311061
RefSeq (protein)	NP_061944; NP_938008	NP_001297990; NP_076115
Location (UCSC)	Chr 7: 120.95 – 120.98 Mb	Chr 6: 21.95 – 21.98 Mb
PubMed search
- Wikidata
View/Edit Human	View/Edit Mouse

Inhibitor of growth protein 3 is a protein that in humans is encoded by the ING3 gene.

== Gene ==
Two alternatively spliced transcript variants encoding different isoforms have been observed.

== Function ==
The protein encoded by this gene is similar to ING1, a tumor suppressor protein that can interact with TP53, inhibit cell growth, and induce apoptosis. This protein contains a PHD finger, which is a common motif in proteins involved in chromatin remodeling. This gene can activate p53 trans-activated promoters, including promoters of p21 (waf1) and bax.

== Clinical significance ==
Overexpression of this gene has been shown to inhibit cell growth and induce apoptosis. Allelic loss and reduced expression of this gene were detected in head and neck cancers.
