= SS18 =

Protein-coding gene in the species Homo sapiens

Identifiers
- Aliases: SS18, SSXT, SYT, nBAF chromatin remodeling complex subunit, SS18 subunit of BAF chromatin remodeling complex, SMARCL1
- External IDs: OMIM: 600192; MGI: 107708; GeneCards: SS18

Gene location (Human)
Chr.	Chromosome 18 (human)
Band	18q11.2	Start	26,016,253 bp
Band	18q11.2	End	26,091,217 bp

Gene location (Mouse)
Chr.	Chromosome 18 (mouse)
Band	18|18 A1	Start	14,757,255 bp
Band	18|18 A1	End	14,815,971 bp
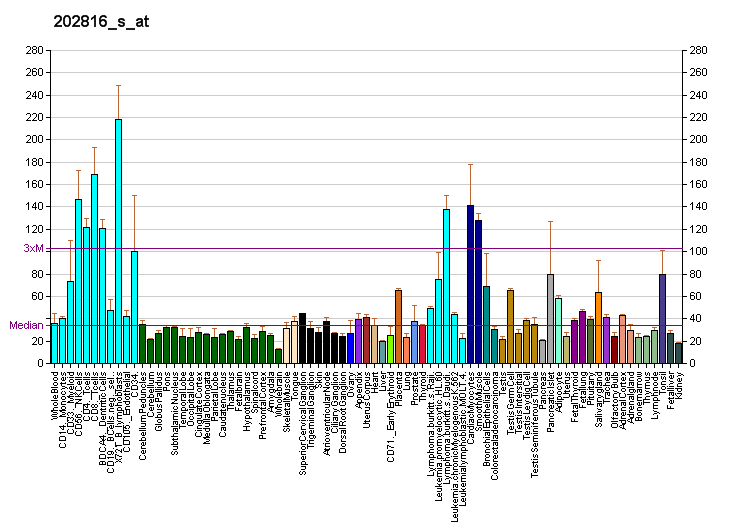

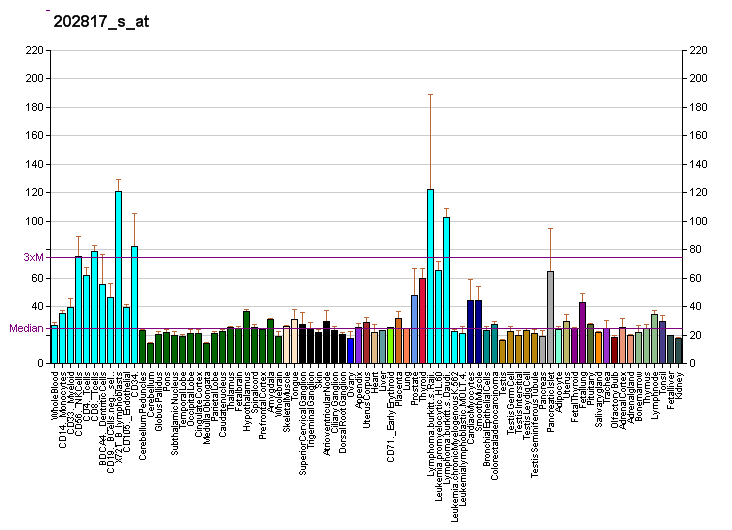

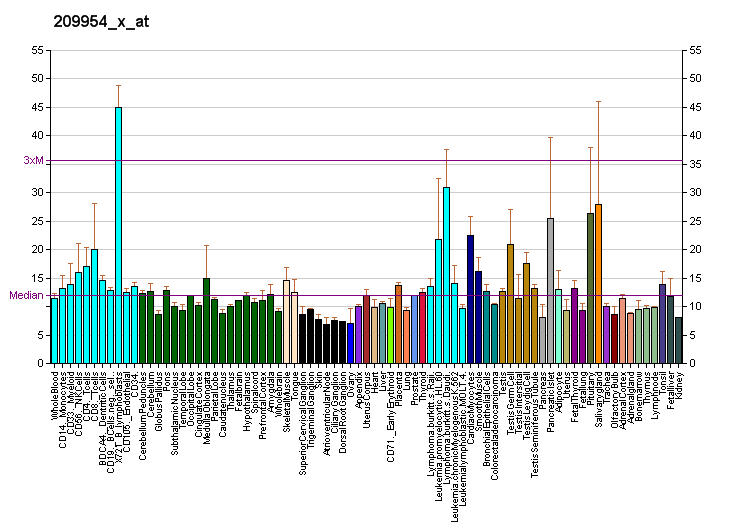
RNA expression pattern
Bgee	Human / Mouse (ortholog); Top expressed in: right adrenal cortex; stromal cell of endometrium; left ovary; Achilles tendon; left adrenal gland; right ovary; left adrenal cortex; skin of abdomen; gallbladder; tibial nerve / Top expressed in: zygote; ventricular zone; esophagus; tail of embryo; genital tubercle; lip; yolk sac; right kidney; morula; blastocyst; More reference expression data
BioGPS	More reference expression data
Gene ontology
Molecular function	protein binding; nuclear receptor coactivator activity; transcription coactivator activity
Cellular component	cytoplasmic microtubule; npBAF complex; nucleus; SWI/SNF complex
Biological process	ephrin receptor signaling pathway; intracellular signal transduction; regulation of transcription, DNA-templated; cytoskeleton organization; microtubule cytoskeleton organization; cell morphogenesis; transcription, DNA-templated; positive regulation of transcription by RNA polymerase II; neuronal stem cell population maintenance; positive regulation of transcription, DNA-templated; regulation of nucleic acid-templated transcription; positive regulation of nucleic acid-templated transcription
Sources:Amigo / QuickGO
Orthologs
Databases	NCBI: entry; OMA: entry
Species	Human	Mouse
Entrez	6760	268996
Ensembl	ENSG00000141380	ENSMUSG00000037013
UniProt	Q15532; Q4VAX0	Q62280
RefSeq (mRNA)	NM_001007559; NM_001308201; NM_005637	NM_001161369; NM_001161370; NM_001161371; NM_009280
RefSeq (protein)	NP_001007560; NP_001295130; NP_005628; NP_005628.2	NP_001154841; NP_001154842; NP_001154843; NP_033306
Location (UCSC)	Chr 18: 26.02 – 26.09 Mb	Chr 18: 14.76 – 14.82 Mb
PubMed search
- Wikidata
View/Edit Human	View/Edit Mouse

Protein SSXT is a protein that in humans is encoded by the SS18 gene.

== Function ==
SS18 is a member of the human SWI/SNF chromatin remodeling complex.

== Clinical significance ==
SS18 is involved in a chromosomal translocation commonly found in synovial sarcoma.

== Interactions ==
SS18 has been shown to interact with:

- EP300,
- MLLT10,
- SMARCA2, and
- SMARCB1.
