= SMARCC1 =

Protein-coding gene in the species Homo sapiens

Identifiers
- Aliases: SMARCC1, BAF155, CRACC1, Rsc8, SRG3, SWI3, SWI/SNF related, matrix associated, actin dependent regulator of chromatin subfamily c member 1
- External IDs: OMIM: 601732; MGI: 1203524; GeneCards: SMARCC1
Available structures
PDB	Ortholog search: PDBe RCSB
PDB	List of PDB id codes 2YUS

Gene location (Human)
Chr.	Chromosome 3 (human)
Band	3p21.31	Start	47,585,269 bp
Band	3p21.31	End	47,782,106 bp

Gene location (Mouse)
Chr.	Chromosome 9 (mouse)
Band	9|9 F2	Start	109,946,776 bp
Band	9|9 F2	End	110,069,246 bp
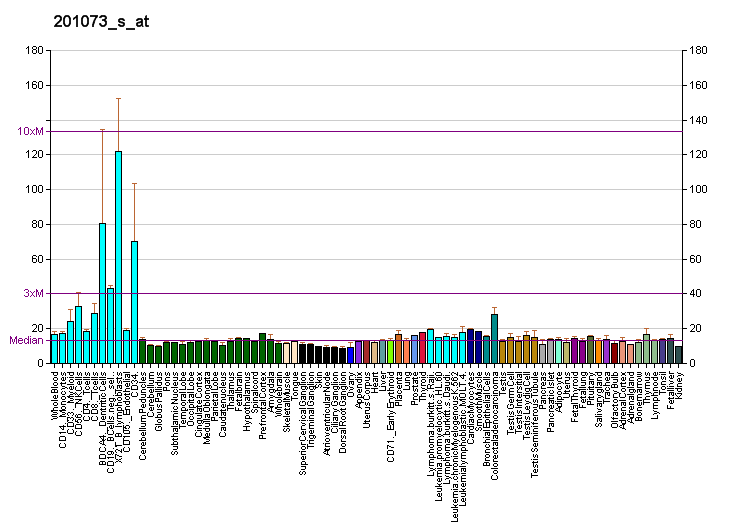

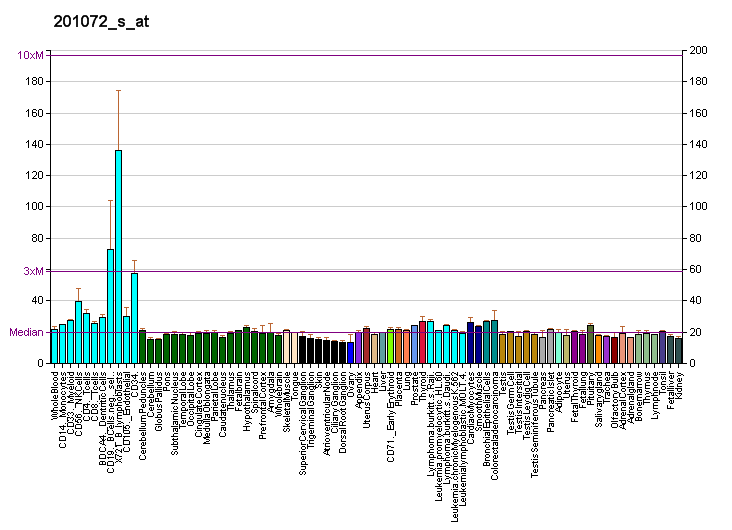

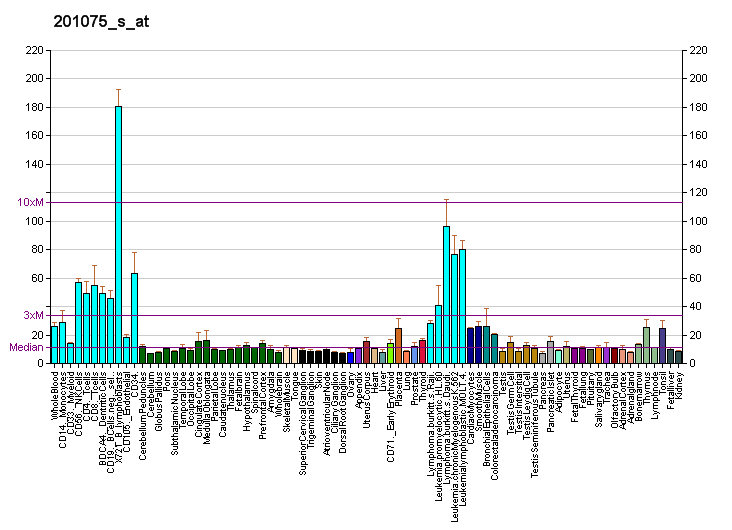
RNA expression pattern
Bgee	Human / Mouse (ortholog); Top expressed in: ventricular zone; embryo; ganglionic eminence; epithelium of colon; sural nerve; tonsil; human penis; sperm; gingival epithelium; endometrium / Top expressed in: Rostral migratory stream; tail of embryo; genital tubercle; internal carotid artery; primitive streak; external carotid artery; abdominal wall; mandibular prominence; maxillary prominence; retinal pigment epithelium; More reference expression data
BioGPS	More reference expression data
Gene ontology
Molecular function	RNA polymerase II cis-regulatory region sequence-specific DNA binding; DNA binding; protein N-terminus binding; transcription coactivator activity; chromatin binding; protein binding; nucleosomal DNA binding; DNA-binding transcription factor activity, RNA polymerase II-specific; histone binding
Cellular component	nBAF complex; SWI/SNF complex; intracellular anatomical structure; nucleoplasm; XY body; npBAF complex; nucleus; cytoplasm; protein-containing complex
Biological process	chromatin remodeling; insulin receptor signaling pathway; regulation of transcription, DNA-templated; regulation of transcription by RNA polymerase II; prostate gland development; transcription, DNA-templated; nervous system development; positive regulation of transcription, DNA-templated; nucleosome disassembly; negative regulation of proteasomal ubiquitin-dependent protein catabolic process; animal organ morphogenesis; positive regulation of transcription by RNA polymerase II; chromatin organization
Sources:Amigo / QuickGO
Orthologs
Databases	NCBI: entry; OMA: entry
Species	Human	Mouse
Entrez	6599	20588
Ensembl	ENSG00000173473	ENSMUSG00000032481
UniProt	Q92922; Q58EY4	P97496
RefSeq (mRNA)	NM_003074	NM_009211
RefSeq (protein)	NP_003065; NP_003065.3	NP_033237
Location (UCSC)	Chr 3: 47.59 – 47.78 Mb	Chr 9: 109.95 – 110.07 Mb
PubMed search
- Wikidata
View/Edit Human	View/Edit Mouse

SWI/SNF complex subunit SMARCC1 is a protein that in humans is encoded by the SMARCC1 gene.

== Function ==
The protein encoded by this gene is a member of the SWI/SNF family of proteins, whose members display helicase and ATPase activities and which are thought to regulate transcription of certain genes by altering the chromatin structure around those genes. The encoded protein is part of the large ATP-dependent chromatin remodeling complex SWI/SNF and contains a predicted leucine zipper motif typical of many transcription factors.

== Interactions ==
SMARCC1 has been shown to interact with:

- BAZ1B,
- ING1,
- SIN3A,
- SMARCA2,
- SMARCA4, and
- SMARCB1.
