= PHF6 =

Protein-coding gene in the species Homo sapiens

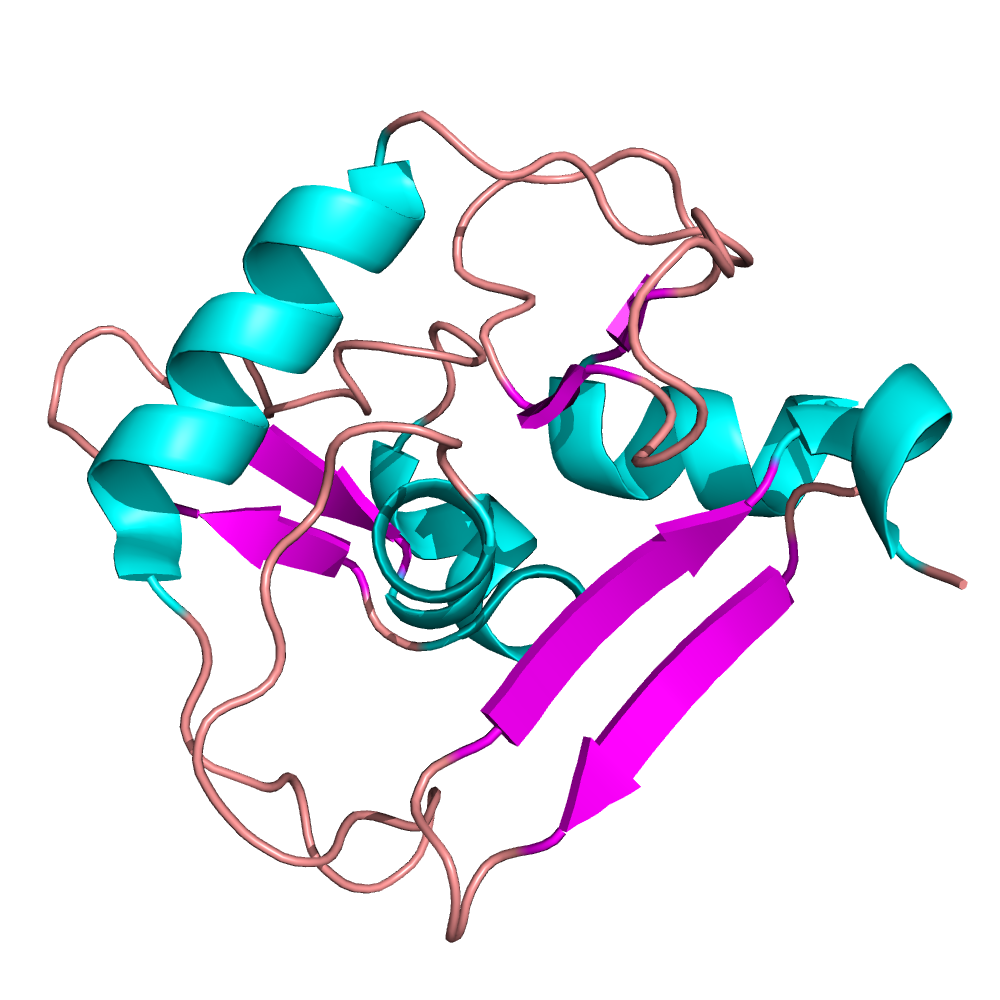

Identifiers
- Aliases: PHF6, BFLS, BORJ, CENP-31, PHD finger protein 6
- External IDs: OMIM: 300414; MGI: 1918248; GeneCards: PHF6
Available structures
PDB	Ortholog search: PDBe RCSB
PDB	List of PDB id codes 4NN2, 4R7A

Gene location (Human)
Chr.	X chromosome (human)
Band	Xq26.2	Start	134,373,288 bp
Band	Xq26.2	End	134,428,791 bp

Gene location (Mouse)
Chr.	X chromosome (mouse)
Band	X|X A5	Start	52,001,143 bp
Band	X|X A5	End	52,045,820 bp
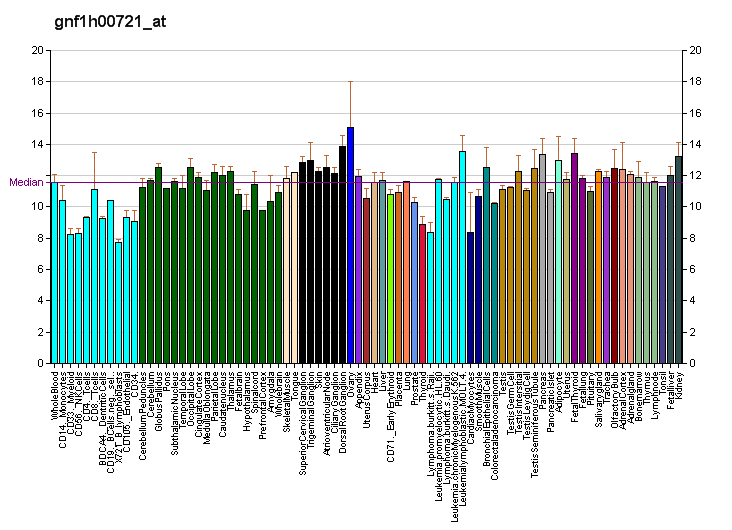
RNA expression pattern
Bgee	Human / Mouse (ortholog); Top expressed in: corpus epididymis; oocyte; endothelial cell; germinal epithelium; secondary oocyte; ganglionic eminence; pancreatic epithelial cell; palpebral conjunctiva; epithelium of nasopharynx; Brodmann area 23 / Top expressed in: hand; superior cervical ganglion; ventricular zone; genital tubercle; tail of embryo; medial ganglionic eminence; zygote; epiblast; maxillary prominence; trigeminal ganglion; More reference expression data
BioGPS	More reference expression data
Gene ontology
Molecular function	tubulin binding; enzyme binding; scaffold protein binding; DNA binding; ribonucleoprotein complex binding; histone binding; phosphoprotein binding; histone deacetylase binding; protein binding; metal ion binding; RNA binding; DNA-binding transcription repressor activity, RNA polymerase II-specific; sequence-specific DNA binding
Cellular component	nucleolus; chromosome, centromeric region; nucleus; kinetochore; nucleoplasm; chromosome
Biological process	regulation of transcription, DNA-templated; transcription, DNA-templated; negative regulation of transcription by RNA polymerase II; blastocyst hatching
Sources:Amigo / QuickGO
Orthologs
Databases	NCBI: entry; OMA: entry
Species	Human	Mouse
Entrez	84295	70998
Ensembl	ENSG00000156531	ENSMUSG00000025626
UniProt	Q8IWS0	Q9D4J7
RefSeq (mRNA)	NM_032458; NM_001015877; NM_032335	NM_001290546; NM_027642
RefSeq (protein)	NP_001015877; NP_115711; NP_115834	NP_001277475; NP_081918
Location (UCSC)	Chr X: 134.37 – 134.43 Mb	Chr X: 52 – 52.05 Mb
PubMed search
- Wikidata
View/Edit Human	View/Edit Mouse

PHD finger protein 6 is a protein that is encoded by the PHF6 gene in humans.

This gene is a member of the plant homeodomain (PHD)-like finger (PHF) family. It encodes a protein with two atypical PHD-type zinc finger domains, indicating a potential role in transcriptional regulation, that localizes to the nucleolus.

== Mutations ==
Mutations affecting the coding region of this gene or the splicing of the transcript have been associated with Börjeson-Forssman-Lehmann syndrome (BFLS), a disorder characterized by mental retardation, epilepsy, hypogonadism, hypometabolism, obesity, swelling of subcutaneous tissue of the face, narrow palpebral fissures, and large ears. Alternate transcriptional splice variants, encoding different isoforms, have been characterized.

The PHF6 gene in humans is also frequently mutated in human hematological malignancies, including T-cell acute lymphoblastic Leukemia (T-ALL) and Acute Myeloid Leukemia (AML) and at least two BFLS patients have developed leukemia or lymphoma. PHF6 has been shown to be important for the regulation of blood stem and progenitor cells and loss of PHF6 protein synergizes with over-expression of the TLX3 protein to cause lymphoid neoplasms.
