= MLLT10 =

Protein-coding gene in the species Homo sapiens

Identifiers
- Aliases: MLLT10, AF10, myeloid/lymphoid or mixed-lineage leukemia; translocated to, 10, histone lysine methyltransferase DOT1L cofactor, MLLT10 histone lysine methyltransferase DOT1L cofactor
- External IDs: OMIM: 602409; MGI: 1329038; GeneCards: MLLT10
Available structures
PDB	Ortholog search: PDBe RCSB
PDB	List of PDB id codes 5DAG, 5DAH

Gene location (Human)
Chr.	Chromosome 10 (human)
Band	10p12.31	Start	21,524,646 bp
Band	10p12.31	End	21,743,630 bp

Gene location (Mouse)
Chr.	Chromosome 2 (mouse)
Band	2|2 A3	Start	18,055,237 bp
Band	2|2 A3	End	18,212,388 bp
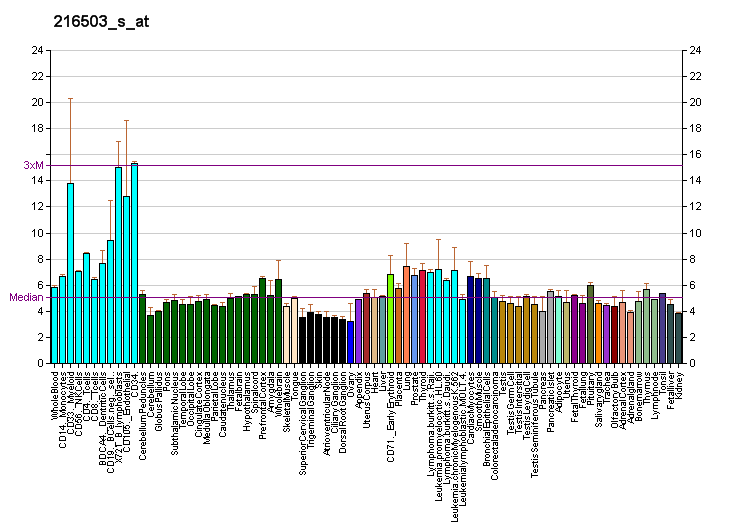
RNA expression pattern
Bgee	Human / Mouse (ortholog); Top expressed in: buccal mucosa cell; epithelium of colon; Achilles tendon; right testis; left testis; secondary oocyte; sperm; tibia; testicle; skin of thigh / Top expressed in: spermatocyte; genital tubercle; tail of embryo; secondary oocyte; primary oocyte; seminiferous tubule; zygote; neural layer of retina; spermatid; granulocyte; More reference expression data
BioGPS	More reference expression data
Gene ontology
Molecular function	DNA-binding transcription factor activity; DNA binding; protein binding; metal ion binding; chromatin binding; nucleosome binding; histone binding
Cellular component	nucleoplasm; nucleus; cytosol; protein-containing complex
Biological process	regulation of transcription, DNA-templated; transcription, DNA-templated; positive regulation of transcription by RNA polymerase II
Sources:Amigo / QuickGO
Orthologs
Databases	NCBI: entry; OMA: entry
Species	Human	Mouse
Entrez	8028	17354
Ensembl	ENSG00000078403	ENSMUSG00000026743
UniProt	P55197	O54826
RefSeq (mRNA)	NM_001009569; NM_001195626; NM_001195627; NM_001195628; NM_001195630 NM_004641; NM_001324296; NM_001324297	NM_001252560; NM_001252561; NM_010804
RefSeq (protein)	NP_001182555; NP_001182556; NP_001182557; NP_001182559; NP_001311225 NP_001311226; NP_004632	NP_001239489; NP_001239490; NP_034934
Location (UCSC)	Chr 10: 21.52 – 21.74 Mb	Chr 2: 18.06 – 18.21 Mb
PubMed search
- Wikidata
View/Edit Human	View/Edit Mouse

Protein AF-10 is a protein that in humans is encoded by the MLLT10 gene.

== Interactions ==
MLLT10 has been shown to interact with SS18.
