= Wilson–Turner syndrome =

Wilson-Turner syndrome
- Specialty: Medical genetics, pediatrics, psychiatry, rare diseases, metabolic diseases, endocrine diseases, mental diseases

Wilson-Turner syndrome (WTS), also known as mental retardation X linked syndromic 6 (MRXS6), and mental retardation X linked with gynecomastia and obesity is a congenital condition characterized by intellectual disability and associated with childhood-onset obesity. It is found to be linked to the X chromosome and caused by a mutation in the HDAC8 gene, which is located on the q arm at locus 13.1. Individuals with Wilson–Turner syndrome have a spectrum of physical characteristics including dysmorphic facial features, hypogonadism, and short stature. Females generally have milder phenotypes than males. This disorder affects all demographics equally and is seen in less than one in one million people.

== History ==
The study of X-linked mental retardation began in 1943 when Martin and Bell reported a family exhibiting sex-linked mental retardation. However, this syndrome was not recognized until 1991. Wilson studied 14 males from three successive generations that presented hypogonadism, mental retardation, gynecomastia, and short stature, among other symptoms. Eventually, this disorder was ruled distinct from a syndrome presented by Prader and Willi (Prader-Willi syndrome) because of its mode of inheritance, gynecomastia, and the presence of small hands and feet. However, there is some speculation that this syndrome is in the same spectrum as the Cornelia de Lange syndrome.

== Symptoms ==
The most notable features of Wilson–Turner syndrome are intellectual disability, obesity, hypogonadism, gynecomastia, and distinct facial features. All of the symptoms are chronic. Affected females are known to have less severe signs and symptoms than males. Female carriers of the disorder may have mild or no symptoms.

- Intellectual disability is the limitation in an individual's mental functioning and skills. Patients with Wilson–Turner syndrome have mental disabilities generally ranging from mild to severe, more frequently the former. This symptom often coincides with delays in speech development and the occurrence of mood swings. Most males were noted to have a quiet and a cheerful disposition. However, individuals who displayed aggression and became easily upset were also seen. Children display delays in speech development often combined with excessive drooling and low voice tones. Some of the studied male patients had speech impairments ranging from little or no speech to minor stuttering.
- Obesity is the accumulation of excess fat on the body. Individuals with Wilson–Turner syndrome are characterized as having truncal obesity, meaning the fat has accumulated in the middle. Truncal obesity is often related to heart disease, kidney disease, and a lowered blood immune system. Truncal obesity in this disorder becomes more apparent around the age of puberty.
- Tapered fingers, in which one end of the finger is diminished in thickness, causing the ends of the fingers to appear pointed. This deformity is not debilitating in any particular manner. In addition to tapered fingers, both hands and feet tend to be small. Some males were observed to have pes planus, also known as flat feet.
- Hypogonadism is a condition in which the gonads have a decrease in function. This condition may result from the lack of sex hormone synthesis, such as androgen and estrogen. Hormones produced by the gonads may also decrease. Hypogonadism also influences the onset of other conditions of Wilson–Turner syndrome, such as gynecomastia and decreased testes size in males. It can also cause short stature in men and women. In addition to little genital development, pubic and body hair are scant.
- Some of the facial features that are associated with Wilson–Turner syndrome include small head circumferences, high foreheads, prominent ears, and noses with flattened bridges. There have been cases of moderately high palates. Low muscle tone and subcutaneous swelling in facial tissue has also been noted. Thick eyebrows are also common. However, there have been reported cases where individuals had none of the mentioned facial features, which shows phenotypic abnormalities which have possible environmental influences.
- Gynecomastia is a non-cancerous increase in male breast tissue. It is believed that disturbances in the endocrine system lead to an increase in estrogen and androgen hormones which cause the development of gynecomastia. A key feature of gynecomastia is rubbery or firm glandular subcutaneous chest tissue that is palpated under the areola of the nipple, instead of the soft fatty tissue. There can also be in increase in the diameter of the areola asymmetry in the chest tissue. The breast enlargement can occur in one or both side. Similar to truncal obesity, gynecomastia becomes apparent around the age of puberty.

== Causes ==
The only known cause of this disorder is the mutation on the HDAC8 gene, which is located at Xq13.1. This disorder displays X-linked inheritance.

== Mechanism ==
=== Pathophysiology ===
The primary symptoms of Wilson-Turner Syndrome is believed to result from an improperly developed histone deacetylase 8. This enzyme is coded by the HDAC8 gene. The identified mutation in the HDAC8 gene leads to a version of histone deacetylase 8 that is missing a segment. Histone deacetylase 8 is believed to be a regulator of the cohesion complex, playing a role in stabilizing the cell's genetic information, repairing damaged DNA, and controlling gene activity. This abnormally shortened protein alters gene regulations during the individual's normal development. Some of the effected normal development lies in the endocrine system. Males will have more estrogen and androgen than normal, leading to enlarged hypogonadism and gynecomastia. Other abnormal development is related to general mental capacity. HDACs are known to be associated with human brain development disorders. HDAC8, in particular, represses transcription factors in neural crest cells to control various patterns of the skull. This contributes to the various forms of facial deformities in individuals with Wilson-Turner Syndrome. Some of the facial deformities caused by the HDAC8 include prominent supraorbital ridges and high cheekbones. Researchers also contribute the error in the HDAC8 gene to obesity. Since the HDAC family proteins are involved in changes in the gene expression in the hypothalamus, it is also believed that the individual's metabolism conditions are altered.

== Diagnosis ==
=== Techniques ===
The diagnosis of Wilson–Turner syndrome is based upon a clinical evaluation, a detailed patient history, and identification of characteristic features. Molecular genetic testing for mutations in the HDAC8 gene is now available to confirm the diagnosis.

=== Criteria ===
The Wilson–Turner syndrome is characterized by mild to moderate range of intellectual disability, obesity, tapered fingers, and mood swings. Males also have gynecomastia and hypogonadism. In order to be diagnosed with Wilson-Turner Syndrome, male patients must have intellectual disability, obesity, and gynecomastia. Females do not necessarily have to have noticeable phenotype but can be diagnosed with this disorder by studying her family history and identifying others with the disorder. It has been noted that children with Wilson-Turner Syndrome will display speech development delay and excessive drooling. Males can be confirmed by testing androgen levels. Female carriers will show silencing of the gene a complex X inactivation.

=== Family and medical history ===
Family medical history is studied in depth due to its X-linked inheritance. The families that were studied and diagnosed with Wilson-Turner Syndrome have shown X-linked recessive pedigree pattern. This disorder only have been identified in two families, thus there is still ongoing studies concerning other inherited factors that may contribute to this disorder.

== Screening ==
Screening methods are mostly done for females to determine if they are carriers. Males do not have to be tested because those with the disorder will show symptoms close to the time they are born because the disorder is inherited from the X chromosome. Females can be tested if they are carriers by performing a X chromosome inactivation analysis on DNA isolated from the peripheral lymphocytes. The CAG repeat in this section must be amplified and methylated DNA must be sorted from unmethylated DNA with PCR. Carrier females will show skewed X-inactivation pattern (skewing close to 100%) with the mutated allele inactivated. This indicates a selection against cells with an active X chromosome with the mutated HDAC8 gene.

== Treatment and prognosis ==
=== Common treatment ===
There is no known cure available for Wilson–Turner syndrome. Instead, treatment options are available to fight individual symptoms. For obesity, a nutritional diet manipulation is combined with an exercise regimen that has a greater energy expenditure than intake. For hypogonadism, testosterone replacement is done. For gynecomastia, weight loss using similar methods for obesity is prescribed. However, if the individual finds their increased breast tissue psychologically distressing or too severe, reduction mammaplasty is done. Currently, researchers are investigating therapies using antiestrogens and aromatase inhibitors to treat persistent pubertal gynecomastia.

=== Long-term complications ===
Unlike Borjeson-Forssman-Lehmann syndrome, a disorder that was determined to be very similar to WTS, the individuals with Wilson–Turner syndrome do not develop cataracts or hypermetropia later in life. By far, the most debilitating part of this disorder is intellectual disability. Many of the other symptoms are more easily managed through hormone treatment, proper diet and exercise, and speech therapy.

== Epidemiology ==
This disorder affects all demographics equally. The two families that were studied are of European ancestry. Wilson–Turner syndrome is considered to be a rare disease because it affects one individual out of one million.

== Recent research ==
In 2012, a study of a five-generation Dutch family consisting of seven males and seven females with Wilson–Turner syndrome. These individuals had some characteristics that differed from the stated phenotype mentioned by Wilson. These individuals have a larger stature, head, and chin, in addition to coarse facial features. Unlike the females in Wilson's study, these females showed signs of being affected, although less severe than their male counterparts. None of the men could live on their own. Studies verified that the phenotype of the disorder range on a large scale and can affect everyone differently. This research group also used next-generation sequencing of the X chromosome exome to identify the HDAC8 gene mutation

There is also ongoing research to determine the cause of the decreased or low androgen levels. It is studying the possible disturbance of the hypothalamic-pituitary-gonadal axis because of the low levels of androgen are combined with normal levels of FSH and LH.

== See also ==
- Prader–Willi syndrome
- Fragile X syndrome
- Börjeson-Forssman-Lehmann syndrome
- Bardet–Biedl syndrome
