= SMARCE1 =

Protein-coding gene in the species Homo sapiens

Identifiers
- Aliases: SMARCE1, BAF57, CSS5, SWI/SNF related, matrix associated, actin dependent regulator of chromatin, subfamily e, member 1
- External IDs: OMIM: 603111; MGI: 1927347; GeneCards: SMARCE1

Gene location (Human)
Chr.	Chromosome 17 (human)
Band	17q21.2	Start	40,624,962 bp
Band	17q21.2	End	40,648,654 bp

Gene location (Mouse)
Chr.	Chromosome 11 (mouse)
Band	11|11 D	Start	99,099,873 bp
Band	11|11 D	End	99,121,843 bp
RNA expression pattern
Bgee	Human / Mouse (ortholog); Top expressed in: Achilles tendon; ganglionic eminence; smooth muscle tissue; ventricular zone; islet of Langerhans; body of uterus; gallbladder; canal of the cervix; rectum; stromal cell of endometrium / Top expressed in: genital tubercle; tail of embryo; superior cervical ganglion; ventricular zone; ganglionic eminence; hand; neural layer of retina; maxillary prominence; mandibular prominence; abdominal wall; More reference expression data
BioGPS	n/a
Gene ontology
Molecular function	RNA polymerase II cis-regulatory region sequence-specific DNA binding; DNA binding; protein N-terminus binding; transcription coactivator activity; N-acetyltransferase activity; chromatin binding; protein binding; nuclear receptor binding; RNA binding; nucleosomal DNA binding; DNA-binding transcription factor activity, RNA polymerase II-specific
Cellular component	nBAF complex; SWI/SNF complex; transcription repressor complex; nucleoplasm; nuclear chromosome; npBAF complex; nucleus; protein-containing complex
Biological process	chromatin remodeling; neurogenesis; regulation of transcription by RNA polymerase II; nervous system development; nucleosome disassembly; negative regulation of transcription, DNA-templated; chromatin organization; positive regulation of nucleic acid-templated transcription
Sources:Amigo / QuickGO
Orthologs
Databases	NCBI: entry; OMA: entry
Species	Human	Mouse
Entrez	6605	57376
Ensembl	ENSG00000073584	ENSMUSG00000037935
UniProt	Q969G3	O54941
RefSeq (mRNA)	NM_003079	NM_020618
RefSeq (protein)	NP_003070; NP_003070.3	NP_065643
Location (UCSC)	Chr 17: 40.62 – 40.65 Mb	Chr 11: 99.1 – 99.12 Mb
PubMed search
- Wikidata
View/Edit Human	View/Edit Mouse

SWI/SNF-related matrix-associated actin-dependent regulator of chromatin subfamily E member 1 is a protein that in humans is encoded by the SMARCE1 gene.

== Function ==
The protein encoded by this gene is part of the large ATP-dependent chromatin remodeling complex SWI/SNF, which is required for transcriptional activation of genes normally repressed by chromatin. The encoded protein, either alone or when in the SWI/SNF complex, can bind to 4-way junction DNA, which is thought to mimic the topology of DNA as it enters or exits the nucleosome. The protein contains a DNA-binding HMG domain, but disruption of this domain does not abolish the DNA-binding or nucleosome-displacement activities of the SWI/SNF complex. Unlike most of the SWI/SNF complex proteins, this protein has no yeast counterpart.

== Interactions ==
SMARCE1 has been shown to interact with Estrogen receptor alpha, SMARCB1 and SMARCA4.
