= ARID1B =

Protein-coding gene in humans

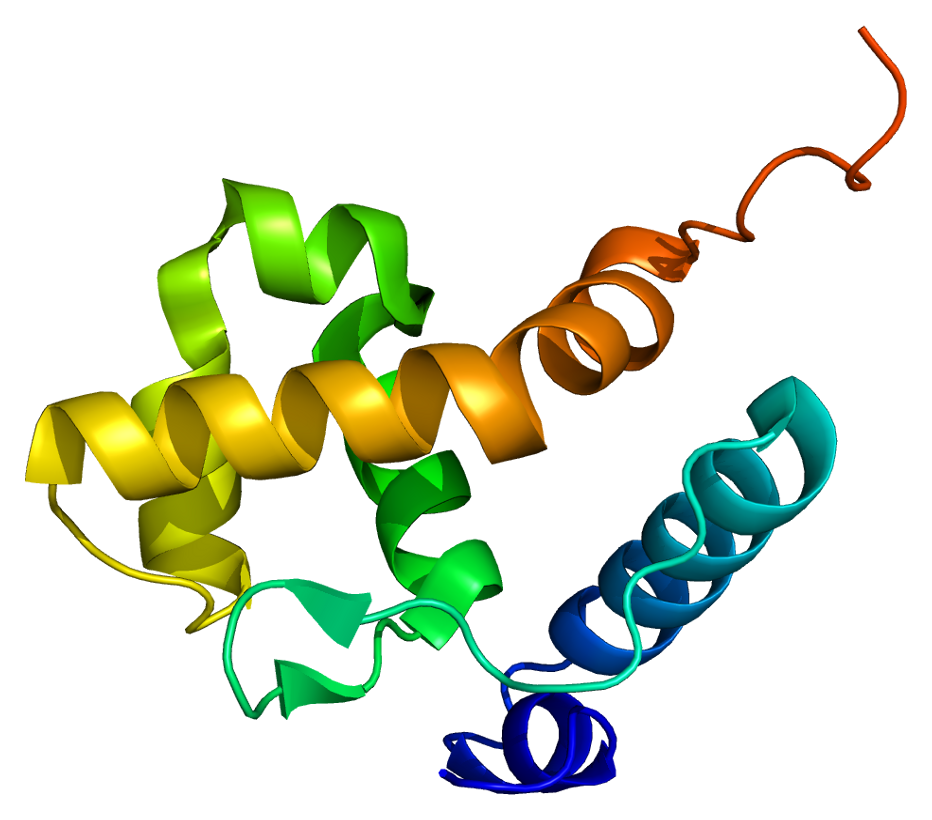

Identifiers
- Aliases: ARID1B, 6A3-5, BAF250B, BRIGHT, DAN15, ELD/OSA1, MRD12, OSA2, P250R, CSS1, AT-rich interaction domain 1B, SMARCF2
- External IDs: OMIM: 614556; MGI: 1926129; GeneCards: ARID1B
Available structures
PDB	Ortholog search: PDBe RCSB
PDB	List of PDB id codes 2CXY, 2EH9

Gene location (Human)
Chr.	Chromosome 6 (human)
Band	6q25.3	Start	156,776,020 bp
Band	6q25.3	End	157,210,779 bp

Gene location (Mouse)
Chr.	Chromosome 17 (mouse)
Band	17|17 A1	Start	5,044,607 bp
Band	17|17 A1	End	5,397,931 bp
RNA expression pattern
Bgee	Human / Mouse (ortholog); Top expressed in: bone marrow cell; epithelium of colon; sural nerve; buccal mucosa cell; skin of arm; Achilles tendon; tonsil; superior surface of tongue; seminal vesicula; left ovary / Top expressed in: Rostral migratory stream; hand; ciliary body; lobe of prostate; medullary collecting duct; zygote; cervix; pineal gland; epithelium of lens; secondary oocyte; More reference expression data
BioGPS	n/a
Gene ontology
Molecular function	DNA binding; transcription coactivator activity; protein binding; DNA-binding transcription factor activity, RNA polymerase II-specific
Cellular component	nBAF complex; nucleus; nucleoplasm; cytosol; plasma membrane; cytoplasm; SWI/SNF superfamily-type complex; SWI/SNF complex; brahma complex
Biological process	chromatin remodeling; regulation of transcription, DNA-templated; transcription, DNA-templated; nervous system development; neuron-neuron synaptic transmission; dendritic spine development; dendritic cell dendrite assembly; response to ischemia; cellular response to angiotensin; chromatin organization; regulation of transcription by RNA polymerase II
Sources:Amigo / QuickGO
Orthologs
Databases	NCBI: entry; OMA: entry
Species	Human	Mouse
Entrez	57492	239985
Ensembl	ENSG00000049618	ENSMUSG00000069729
UniProt	Q8NFD5	E9Q4N7
RefSeq (mRNA)	NM_017519; NM_001363725; NM_001371656; NM_001374820; NM_001374828	NM_001085355
RefSeq (protein)	NP_059989; NP_001350654; NP_001358585; NP_001361749; NP_001361757	NP_001078824
Location (UCSC)	Chr 6: 156.78 – 157.21 Mb	Chr 17: 5.04 – 5.4 Mb
PubMed search
- Wikidata
View/Edit Human	View/Edit Mouse

AT-rich interactive domain-containing protein 1B is a protein that in humans is encoded by the ARID1B gene. ARID1B is a component of the human SWI/SNF chromatin remodeling complex.

== Clinical significance ==
Germline mutations in ARID1B are associated with Coffin–Siris syndrome. Somatic mutations in ARID1B are associated with several cancer subtypes, suggesting that it is a tumor suppressor gene.

== Interactions ==
ARID1B has been shown to interact with SMARCA4 and SMARCA2.
