= DPF2 =

Protein-coding gene in the species Homo sapiens

Identifiers
- Aliases: DPF2, REQ, UBID4, ubi-d4, double PHD fingers 2, CSS7, SMARCG2
- External IDs: OMIM: 601671; MGI: 109529; GeneCards: DPF2
Available structures
PDB	Ortholog search: PDBe RCSB
PDB	List of PDB id codes 3IUF

Gene location (Human)
Chr.	Chromosome 11 (human)
Band	11q13.1	Start	65,333,852 bp
Band	11q13.1	End	65,354,262 bp

Gene location (Mouse)
Chr.	Chromosome 19 (mouse)
Band	19 A|19 4.34 cM	Start	5,946,544 bp
Band	19 A|19 4.34 cM	End	5,963,038 bp
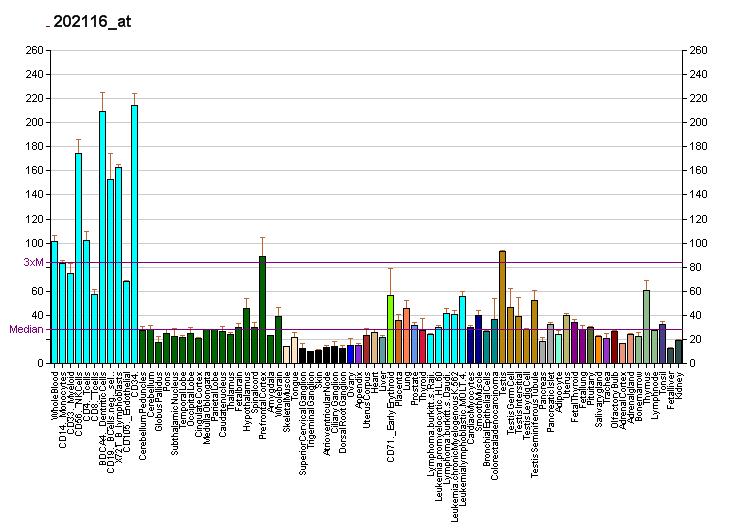
RNA expression pattern
Bgee	Human / Mouse (ortholog); Top expressed in: oocyte; secondary oocyte; Achilles tendon; ventricular zone; body of uterus; right ovary; left ovary; ganglionic eminence; canal of the cervix; muscle layer of sigmoid colon / Top expressed in: tail of embryo; genital tubercle; neural layer of retina; ventricular zone; otic vesicle; internal carotid artery; external carotid artery; primitive streak; epiblast; lens; More reference expression data
BioGPS	More reference expression data
Gene ontology
Molecular function	metal ion binding; RNA polymerase II cis-regulatory region sequence-specific DNA binding; protein binding; nucleic acid binding; DNA-binding transcription factor activity, RNA polymerase II-specific; transcription corepressor activity; histone acetyltransferase activity; histone binding; H3K9me3 modified histone binding; lysine-acetylated histone binding
Cellular component	nucleus; nucleoplasm; intracellular membrane-bounded organelle; centrosome; cytoplasm; cytosol; histone acetyltransferase complex; nBAF complex
Biological process	regulation of transcription, DNA-templated; transcription, DNA-templated; apoptotic signaling pathway; apoptotic process; negative regulation of transcription by RNA polymerase II; chromatin organization; nervous system development; histone acetylation; negative regulation of transcription, DNA-templated; positive regulation of transcription by RNA polymerase II; negative regulation of myeloid progenitor cell differentiation
Sources:Amigo / QuickGO
Orthologs
Databases	NCBI: entry; OMA: entry
Species	Human	Mouse
Entrez	5977	19708
Ensembl	ENSG00000133884	ENSMUSG00000024826
UniProt	Q92785	Q61103
RefSeq (mRNA)	NM_006268; NM_001330308	NM_001291078; NM_011262
RefSeq (protein)	NP_001317237; NP_006259; NP_006259.1	NP_001278007; NP_035392
Location (UCSC)	Chr 11: 65.33 – 65.35 Mb	Chr 19: 5.95 – 5.96 Mb
PubMed search
- Wikidata
View/Edit Human	View/Edit Mouse

Zinc finger protein ubi-d4 is a protein that in humans is encoded by the DPF2 gene.

The protein encoded by this gene is a member of the d4 domain family, characterized by a zinc finger-like structural motif. This protein functions as a transcription factor which is necessary for the apoptotic response following deprivation of survival factors. It likely serves a regulatory role in rapid hematopoietic cell growth and turnover. This gene is considered a candidate gene for multiple endocrine neoplasia type I, an inherited cancer syndrome involving multiple parathyroid, enteropancreatic, and pituitary tumors.
