= SMARCB1 =

Protein-coding gene in the species Homo sapiens

Identifiers
- Aliases: SMARCB1, BAF47, INI1, MRD15, PPP1R144, RDT, RTPS1, SNF5, SNF5L1, SWNTS1, Sfh1p, Snr1, hSNFS, CSS3, SWI/SNF related, matrix associated, actin dependent regulator of chromatin, subfamily b, member 1, INI-1
- External IDs: OMIM: 601607; MGI: 1328366; GeneCards: SMARCB1
Available structures
PDB	Ortholog search: PDBe RCSB
PDB	List of PDB id codes 5AJ1

Gene location (Human)
Chr.	Chromosome 22 (human)
Band	22q11.23|22q11	Start	23,786,931 bp
Band	22q11.23|22q11	End	23,838,009 bp

Gene location (Mouse)
Chr.	Chromosome 10 (mouse)
Band	10|10 C1	Start	75,732,603 bp
Band	10|10 C1	End	75,757,451 bp
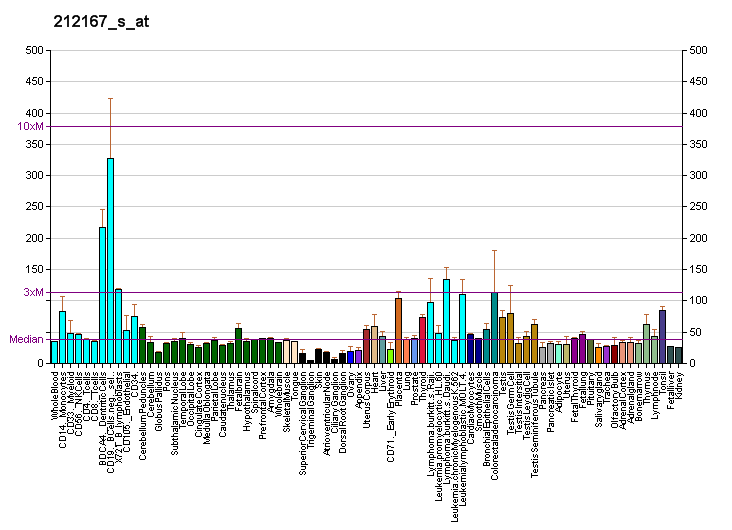
RNA expression pattern
Bgee	Human / Mouse (ortholog); Top expressed in: ganglionic eminence; ventricular zone; right hemisphere of cerebellum; stromal cell of endometrium; olfactory zone of nasal mucosa; islet of Langerhans; left testis; left ovary; right testis; right ovary / Top expressed in: Rostral migratory stream; ventricular zone; ganglionic eminence; external carotid artery; internal carotid artery; epiblast; Paneth cell; Ileal epithelium; embryo; medial ganglionic eminence; More reference expression data
BioGPS	More reference expression data
Gene ontology
Molecular function	RNA polymerase II cis-regulatory region sequence-specific DNA binding; DNA binding; RNA polymerase I core promoter sequence-specific DNA binding; transcription coactivator activity; p53 binding; Tat protein binding; protein binding; nucleosomal DNA binding
Cellular component	nucleoplasm; nuclear chromosome; nucleolus; nucleus; fibrillar center; intracellular membrane-bounded organelle; SWI/SNF complex; npBAF complex; nBAF complex; protein-containing complex; brahma complex
Biological process	positive regulation of glucose mediated signaling pathway; chromatin remodeling; regulation of transcription, DNA-templated; DNA integration; positive regulation of histone H3-K9 acetylation; regulation of transcription by RNA polymerase II; positive regulation of transcription of nucleolar large rRNA by RNA polymerase I; positive regulation of DNA-binding transcription factor activity; transcription, DNA-templated; nervous system development; nucleosome disassembly; positive regulation of histone H4 acetylation; single stranded viral RNA replication via double stranded DNA intermediate; cell cycle; negative regulation of histone H3-K9 trimethylation; regulation of histone H4-K16 acetylation; viral process; negative regulation of histone H3-K9 dimethylation; DNA repair; positive regulation by host of viral transcription; positive regulation of transcription by RNA polymerase II; negative regulation of cell population proliferation; cell differentiation; RNA polymerase I preinitiation complex assembly; chromatin organization
Sources:Amigo / QuickGO
Orthologs
Databases	NCBI: entry; OMA: entry
Species	Human	Mouse
Entrez	6598	20587
Ensembl	ENSG00000099956; ENSG00000275837	ENSMUSG00000000902
UniProt	Q12824	Q9Z0H3
RefSeq (mRNA)	NM_001007468; NM_003073; NM_001317946; NM_001362877	NM_001161853; NM_011418
RefSeq (protein)	NP_001007469; NP_001304875; NP_003064; NP_001349806	NP_001155325; NP_035548
Location (UCSC)	Chr 22: 23.79 – 23.84 Mb	Chr 10: 75.73 – 75.76 Mb
PubMed search
- Wikidata
View/Edit Human	View/Edit Mouse

SWI/SNF-related matrix-associated actin-dependent regulator of chromatin subfamily B member 1 is a protein that in humans is encoded by the SMARCB1 gene.

== Function ==
The protein encoded by this gene is part of a complex that relieves repressive chromatin structures, allowing the transcriptional machinery to access its targets more effectively. The encoded nuclear protein may also bind to and enhance the DNA joining activity of HIV-1 integrase. This gene has been found to be a tumor suppressor and mutations in it have been associated with malignant rhabdoid tumors. Two transcript variants encoding different isoforms have been found for this gene.

== Interactions ==
SMARCB1 has been shown to interact with:

- ARID1A,
- BAZ1B,
- BRCA1,
- CREB-binding protein,
- Cyclin-dependent kinase 8,
- Myc,
- P53,
- POLR2A,
- PPP1CA,
- PPP1CB,
- PPP1CC,
- PPP1R15A,
- SMARCA2,
- SMARCA4,
- SMARCC1,
- SMARCE1,
- SS18, and
- XPO1.
