= SMARCA4 =

Protein-coding gene in the species Homo sapiens

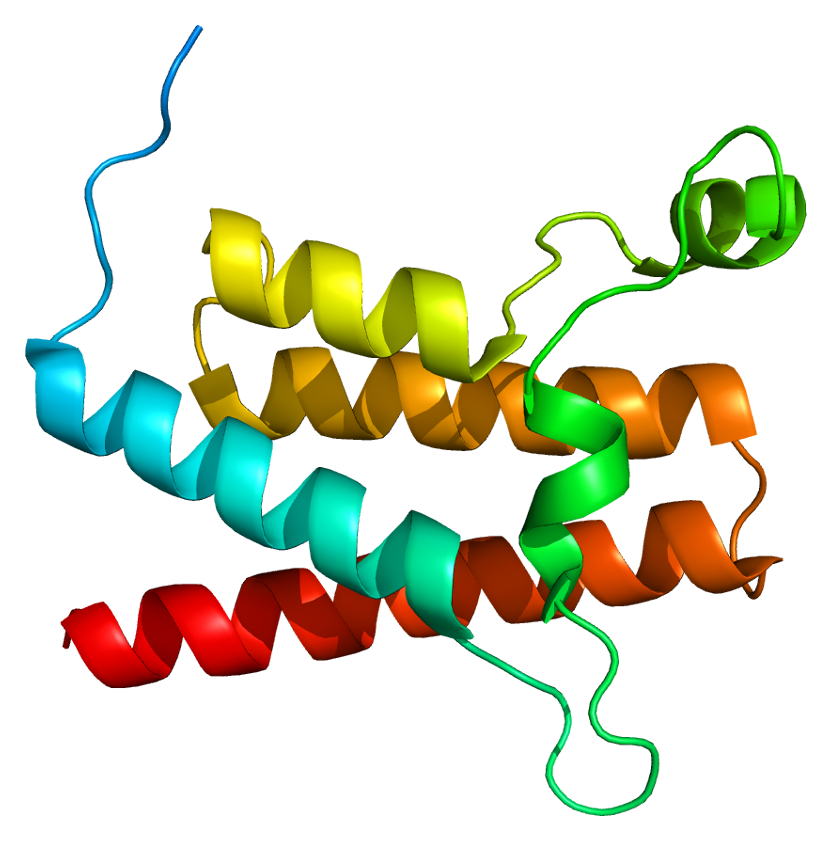

Identifiers
- Aliases: SMARCA4, BAF190, BAF190A, BRG1, MRD16, RTPS2, SNF2, SNF2L4, SNF2LB, SWI2, hSNF2b, CSS4, SWI/SNF related, matrix associated, actin dependent regulator of chromatin, subfamily a, member 4
- External IDs: OMIM: 603254; MGI: 88192; GeneCards: SMARCA4
Available structures
| PDB | Ortholog search: PDBe RCSB |
| PDB | List of PDB id codes 2GRC, 2H60, 3UVD, 5DKD, 5EA1 |

Gene location (Human)
| Chr. | Chromosome 19 (human) |
| Band | 19p13.2 | Start | 10,961,001 bp |
| Band | 19p13.2 | End | 11,065,395 bp |

Gene location (Mouse)
| Chr. | Chromosome 9 (mouse) |
| Band | 9 A3|9 7.84 cM | Start | 21,527,465 bp |
| Band | 9 A3|9 7.84 cM | End | 21,615,526 bp |
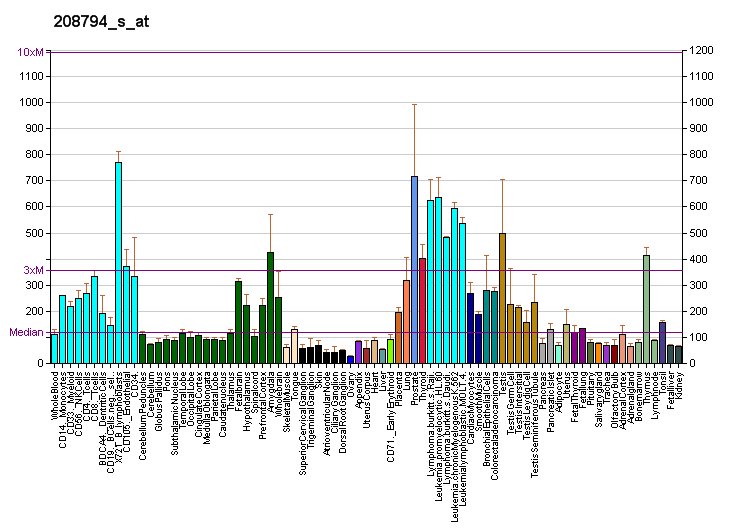

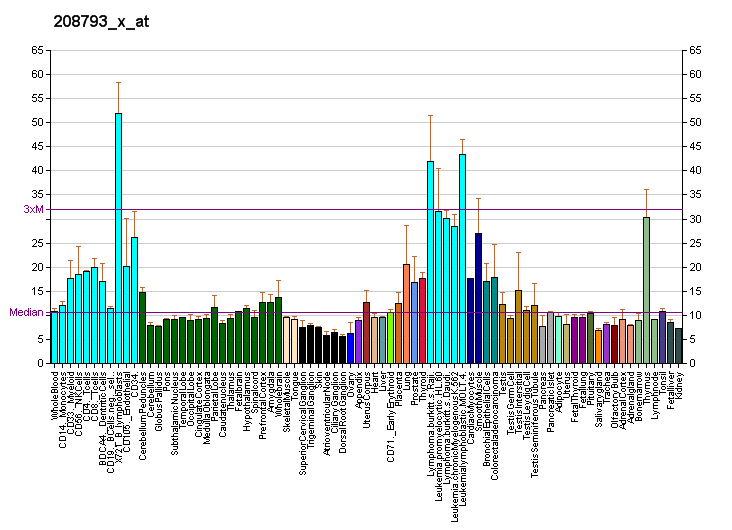

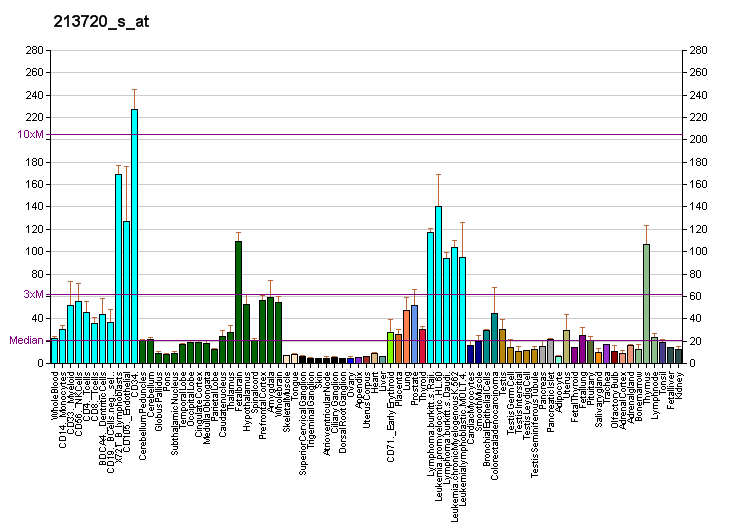
RNA expression pattern
| Bgee | Human / Mouse (ortholog); Top expressed in: ganglionic eminence; tendon of biceps brachii; ventricular zone; amniotic fluid; epithelium of nasopharynx; sural nerve; middle temporal gyrus; primary visual cortex; endothelial cell; right hemisphere of cerebellum / Top expressed in: Rostral migratory stream; otic vesicle; hand; ganglionic eminence; mandibular prominence; somite; tail of embryo; internal carotid artery; Gonadal ridge; maxillary prominence; More reference expression data |
| BioGPS | More reference expression data |
Gene ontology
| Molecular function | RNA polymerase II cis-regulatory region sequence-specific DNA binding; nucleotide binding; transcription coactivator activity; ATP-dependent activity, acting on DNA; RNA polymerase I core promoter sequence-specific DNA binding; helicase activity; transcription corepressor activity; protein N-terminus binding; histone binding; p53 binding; transcription factor binding; Tat protein binding; DNA polymerase binding; hydrolase activity, acting on acid anhydrides; ATPase activity; protein binding; androgen receptor binding; lysine-acetylated histone binding; nucleosomal DNA binding; hydrolase activity; ATP binding; RNA binding; DNA binding |
| Cellular component | nBAF complex; membrane; SWI/SNF complex; nucleoplasm; npBAF complex; nucleolus; nucleus; extracellular space; protein-containing complex |
| Biological process | positive regulation of glucose mediated signaling pathway; chromatin remodeling; regulation of transcription, DNA-templated; regulation of transcription by RNA polymerase II; positive regulation of transcription of nucleolar large rRNA by RNA polymerase I; negative regulation of androgen receptor signaling pathway; positive regulation of DNA-binding transcription factor activity; negative regulation of transcription by RNA polymerase II; transcription, DNA-templated; nervous system development; positive regulation of transcription, DNA-templated; positive regulation of Wnt signaling pathway; negative regulation of G1/S transition of mitotic cell cycle; negative regulation of cell growth; positive regulation of pri-miRNA transcription by RNA polymerase II; positive regulation by host of viral transcription; neural retina development; positive regulation of transcription by RNA polymerase II; beta-catenin-TCF complex assembly; nucleosome disassembly; negative regulation of transcription, DNA-templated; chromatin organization; interleukin-7-mediated signaling pathway; RNA polymerase I preinitiation complex assembly |
Sources:Amigo / QuickGO
Orthologs
| Databases | NCBI: entry; OMA: entry |
| Species | Human | Mouse |
| Entrez | 6597 | 20586 |
| Ensembl | ENSG00000127616 | ENSMUSG00000032187 |
| UniProt | P51532; Q9HBD4 | Q3TKT4 |
| RefSeq (mRNA) | NM_001128844; NM_001128845; NM_001128846; NM_001128847; NM_001128848 NM_001128849; NM_003072 | NM_001174078; NM_001174079; NM_011417; NM_001357764 |
| RefSeq (protein) | NP_001122316; NP_001122317; NP_001122318; NP_001122319; NP_001122320 NP_001122321; NP_003063; NP_001361386; NP_001122321.1 | NP_001167549; NP_001167550; NP_035547; NP_001344693 |
| Location (UCSC) | Chr 19: 10.96 – 11.07 Mb | Chr 9: 21.53 – 21.62 Mb |
| PubMed search |
- Wikidata
| View/Edit Human | View/Edit Mouse |

Transcription activator BRG1 also known as ATP-dependent chromatin remodeler SMARCA4 is a protein that in humans is encoded by the SMARCA4 gene.

== Function ==
The protein encoded by this gene is a member of the SWI/SNF family of proteins and is similar to the brahma protein of Drosophila. Members of this family have helicase and ATPase activities and are thought to regulate transcription of certain genes by altering the chromatin structure around those genes. The encoded protein is part of the large ATP-dependent chromatin remodeling complex SWI/SNF, which is required for transcriptional activation of genes normally repressed by chromatin. In addition, this protein can bind BRCA1, as well as regulate the expression of the tumorigenic protein CD44.

BRG1 works to activate or repress transcription. Having functional BRG1 is important for development past the pre-implantation stage. Without having a functional BRG1, exhibited with knockout research, the embryo will not hatch out of the zona pellucida, which will inhibit implantation from occurring on the endometrium (uterine wall). BRG1 is also crucial to the development of sperm. During the first stages of meiosis in spermatogenesis there are high levels of BRG1. When BRG1 is genetically damaged, meiosis is stopped in prophase 1, hindering the development of sperm and would result in infertility. More knockout research has concluded BRG1's aid in the development of smooth muscle. In a BRG1 knockout, smooth muscle in the gastrointestinal tract lacks contractility, and intestines are incomplete in some cases. Another defect occurring in knocking out BRG1 in smooth muscle development is heart complications such as an open ductus arteriosus after birth.

== Clinical significance ==
BRG1 (or SMARCA4) is the most frequently mutated chromatin remodeling ATPase in cancer. Mutations in this gene were first recognized in human cancer cell lines derived from adrenal gland and lung. Later it was recognized that mutations exist in a significant frequency of medulloblastoma and pancreatic cancers, and in many other tumor subtypes.

In cancer, mutations in BRG1 show an unusually high preference for missense mutations that are frequently heterozygous and target the ATPase domain. Mutations are enriched at highly conserved ATPase sequences, which lie on important functional surfaces such as the ATP pocket or DNA-binding surface. These mutations act in a genetically dominant manner to alter chromatin regulatory function at enhancers and promoters.

Mutations of BRG1 are associated with context-dependent expression changes at MYC-genes, which indicates that the BRG1 and MYC proteins are functionally related. Another study demonstrated a causal role of BRG1 in the control of retinoic acid and glucocorticoid-induced cell differentiation in lung cancer and in other tumor types. This enables the cancer cell to sustain undifferentiated gene expression programs that affect the control of key cellular processes. Furthermore, it explains why lung cancer and other solid tumors are completely refractory to treatments based on these compounds that are effective therapies for some types of leukemia.

The role of BRG1 in sensitivity or resistance to anti-cancer drugs had been recently highlighted by the elucidation of the mechanisms of action of darinaparsin, an arsenic-based anti-cancer drugs. Darinaparsin has been shown to induce phosphorylation of BRG1, which leads to its exclusion from chromatin. When excluded from the chromatin, BRG1 can no longer act as a transcriptional co-regulator. This leads to the inability of cells to express HO-1, a cytoprotective enzyme.

== Interactions ==
SMARCA4 has been shown to interact with:

- ACTL6A,
- ARID1A,
- ARID1B,
- BRCA1,
- CTNNB1,
- CBX5,
- CREBBP,
- CCNE1,
- ESR1,
- FANCA,
- HSP90B1,
- ING1,
- Myc,
- NR3C1,
- P53,
- POLR2A,
- PHB,
- SIN3A,
- SMARCB1,
- SMARCC1,
- SMARCC2,
- SMARCE1,
- STAT2, and
- STK11.
