= ING1 =

Protein-coding gene in the species Homo sapiens

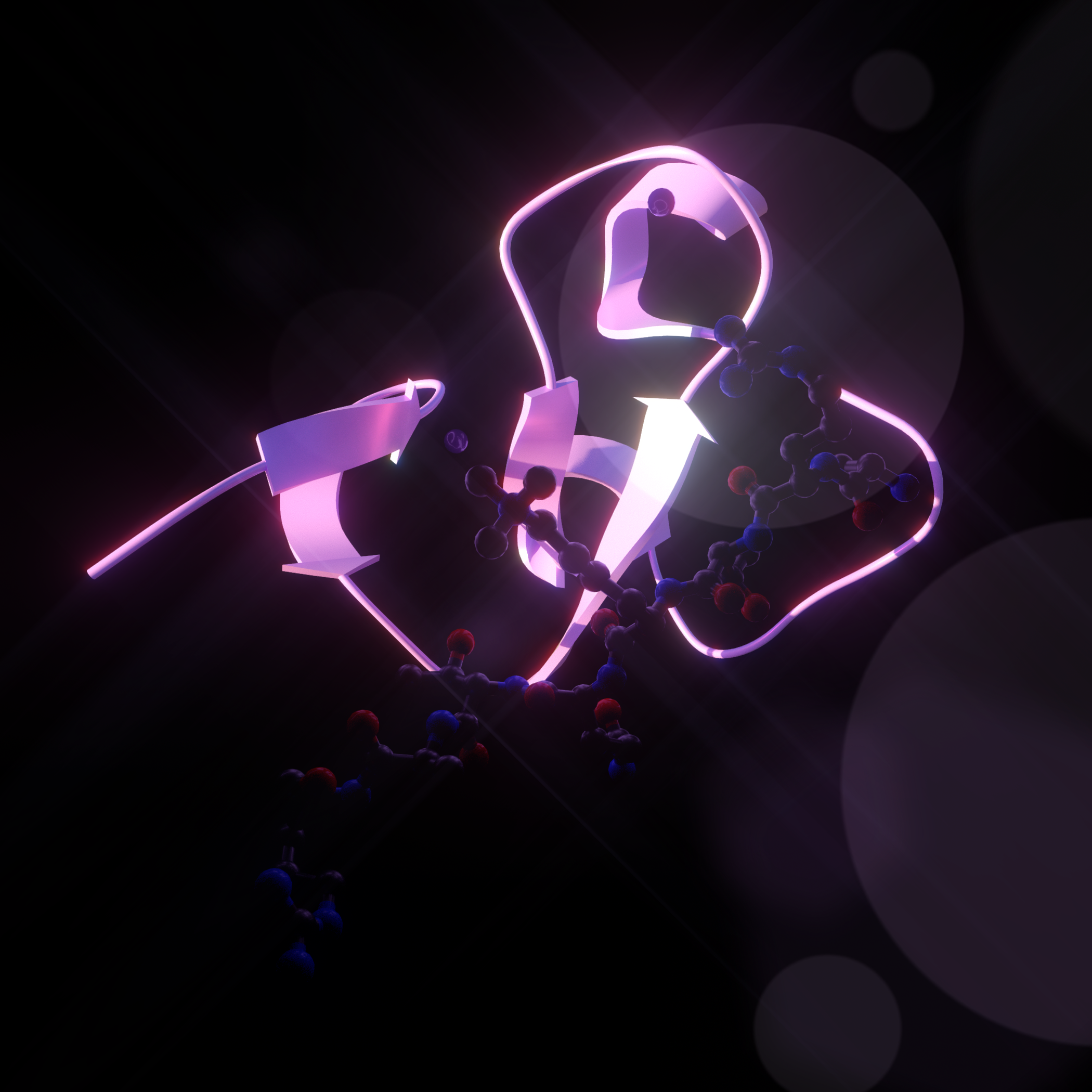

Identifiers
- Aliases: ING1, p24ING1c, p33, p33p33ING1b, p47, p47ING1a, inhibitor of growth family member 1
- External IDs: OMIM: 601566; MGI: 1349481; GeneCards: ING1
Available structures
PDB	Ortholog search: PDBe RCSB
PDB	List of PDB id codes 2QIC

Gene location (Human)
Chr.	Chromosome 13 (human)
Band	13q34	Start	110,712,736 bp
Band	13q34	End	110,723,339 bp

Gene location (Mouse)
Chr.	Chromosome 8 (mouse)
Band	8|8 A1.1	Start	11,605,571 bp
Band	8|8 A1.1	End	11,613,251 bp
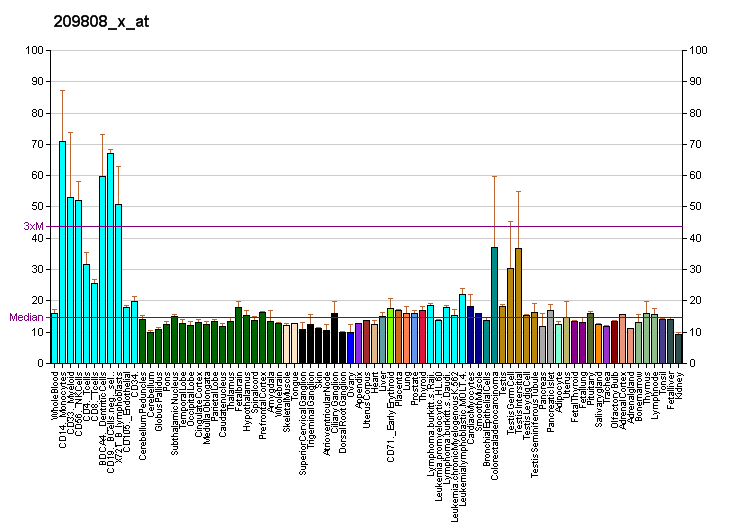

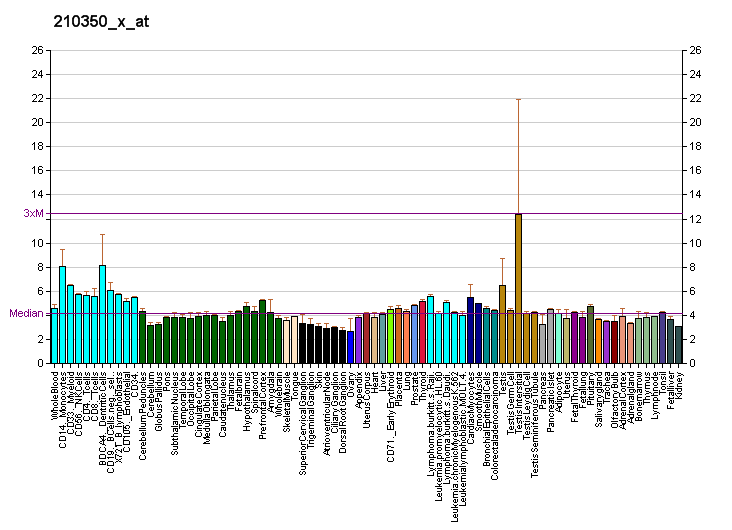

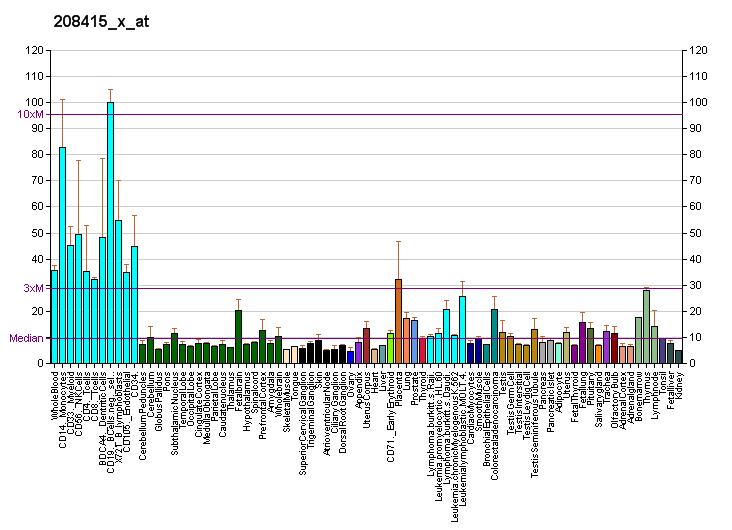
RNA expression pattern
Bgee	Human / Mouse (ortholog); Top expressed in: stromal cell of endometrium; ganglionic eminence; ventricular zone; gonad; left testis; right testis; monocyte; endothelial cell; blood; decidua / Top expressed in: primitive streak; genital tubercle; Rostral migratory stream; tail of embryo; secondary oocyte; ureter; vas deferens; medullary collecting duct; abdominal wall; primary oocyte; More reference expression data
BioGPS	More reference expression data
Gene ontology
Molecular function	methylated histone binding; protein binding; metal ion binding
Cellular component	nucleus
Biological process	regulation of cell death; cell cycle; negative regulation of cell growth; negative regulation of cell population proliferation; positive regulation of transcription, DNA-templated
Sources:Amigo / QuickGO
Orthologs
Databases	NCBI: entry; OMA: entry
Species	Human	Mouse
Entrez	3621	26356
Ensembl	ENSG00000153487	ENSMUSG00000045969
UniProt	Q9UK53	Q9QXV3
RefSeq (mRNA)	NM_198219; NM_001267728; NM_005537; NM_198217; NM_198218	NM_011919; NM_001302451; NM_001302457; NM_001302458; NM_001302459 NM_001302460
RefSeq (protein)	NP_001254657; NP_005528; NP_937860; NP_937861; NP_937862	NP_001289380; NP_001289386; NP_001289387; NP_001289388; NP_001289389 NP_036049
Location (UCSC)	Chr 13: 110.71 – 110.72 Mb	Chr 8: 11.61 – 11.61 Mb
PubMed search
- Wikidata
View/Edit Human	View/Edit Mouse

Inhibitor of growth protein 1 is a protein that in humans is encoded by the ING1 gene.

== Function ==
This gene encodes a tumor suppressor protein that can induce cell growth arrest and apoptosis. The encoded protein is a nuclear protein that physically interacts with the tumor suppressor protein TP53 and is a component of the p53 signaling pathway. Reduced expression and rearrangement of this gene have been detected in various cancers. Multiple alternatively spliced transcript variants encoding distinct isoforms have been reported.

One of the isoforms of ING1 (p33(ING1) is involved in the modulation of DNA repair. It appears that p33(ING1) cooperates with p53 in nucleotide excision repair. Also, proliferating cell nuclear antigen (PCNA) interacts with p33(ING1b) in the elimination of UV-damaged cells through the induction of programmed cell death (apoptosis).

== Location on Chromosome 13 ==
ING1 is located near the following genes on Chromosome 13

- NAXD: NAD(P)HX dehydratase
- COL4A2: A2 Subunit of type IV collagen
- RAB20: Potential regulator of Connexin 43 trafficking.
- CARS2: Mitochondrial Cystienyl-tRNA Synthetase 2

== Interactions ==
ING1 has been shown to interact with:

- CREB binding protein,
- DMAP1,
- HDAC1,
- P53,
- PCNA,
- SAP30,
- SIN3A,
- SMARCA4, and
- SMARCC1.
