= SMARCC2 =

Protein-coding gene in the species Homo sapiens

Identifiers
- Aliases: SMARCC2, BAF170, CRACC2, Rsc8, SWI/SNF related, matrix associated, actin dependent regulator of chromatin subfamily c member 2, CSS8
- External IDs: OMIM: 601734; MGI: 1915344; GeneCards: SMARCC2

Gene location (Human)
Chr.	Chromosome 12 (human)
Band	12q13.2	Start	56,162,359 bp
Band	12q13.2	End	56,189,567 bp

Gene location (Mouse)
Chr.	Chromosome 10 (mouse)
Band	10|10 D3	Start	128,295,117 bp
Band	10|10 D3	End	128,326,351 bp
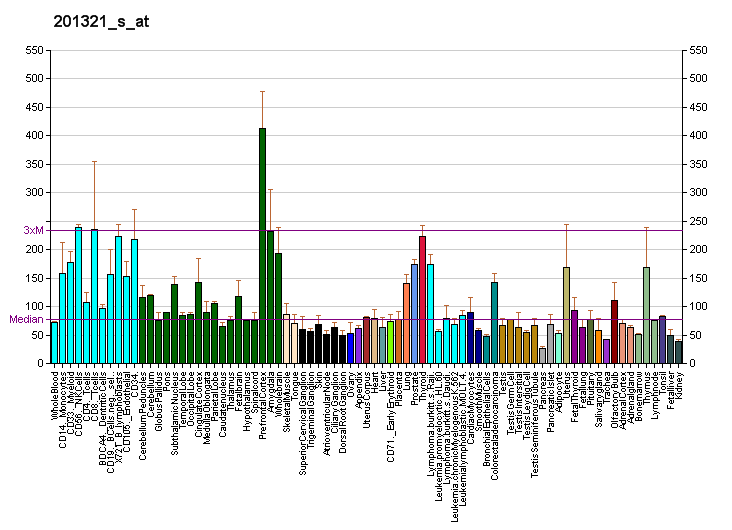

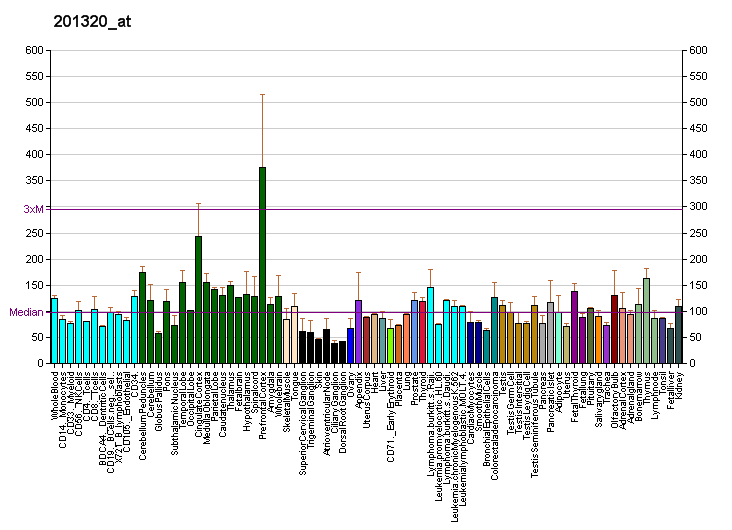
RNA expression pattern
Bgee	Human / Mouse (ortholog); Top expressed in: ventricular zone; ganglionic eminence; left ovary; right lobe of thyroid gland; right ovary; right hemisphere of cerebellum; sural nerve; body of uterus; left lobe of thyroid gland; canal of the cervix / Top expressed in: genital tubercle; neural layer of retina; primary visual cortex; cerebellar cortex; superior frontal gyrus; dentate gyrus of hippocampal formation granule cell; tail of embryo; ventricular zone; suprachiasmatic nucleus; zygote; More reference expression data
BioGPS	More reference expression data
Gene ontology
Molecular function	RNA polymerase II cis-regulatory region sequence-specific DNA binding; DNA binding; transcription coactivator activity; protein binding; nucleosomal DNA binding; DNA-binding transcription factor activity, RNA polymerase II-specific; histone binding
Cellular component	transcription repressor complex; nucleoplasm; nucleus; SWI/SNF complex; npBAF complex; nBAF complex; protein-containing complex
Biological process	regulation of transcription, DNA-templated; transcription, DNA-templated; nervous system development; positive regulation of transcription, DNA-templated; nucleosome disassembly; negative regulation of transcription, DNA-templated; chromatin remodeling; regulation of transcription by RNA polymerase II; chromatin organization
Sources:Amigo / QuickGO
Orthologs
Databases	NCBI: entry; OMA: entry
Species	Human	Mouse
Entrez	6601	68094
Ensembl	ENSG00000139613	ENSMUSG00000025369
UniProt	Q8TAQ2	Q6PDG5
RefSeq (mRNA)	NM_001130420; NM_003075; NM_139067; NM_001330288	NM_001114096; NM_001114097; NM_198160; NM_001372395
RefSeq (protein)	NP_001123892; NP_001317217; NP_003066; NP_620706	NP_001107568; NP_001107569; NP_937803; NP_001359324
Location (UCSC)	Chr 12: 56.16 – 56.19 Mb	Chr 10: 128.3 – 128.33 Mb
PubMed search
- Wikidata
View/Edit Human	View/Edit Mouse

SWI/SNF complex subunit SMARCC2 is a protein that in humans is encoded by the SMARCC2 gene.

== Function ==
The protein encoded by this gene is a member of the SWI/SNF family of proteins, whose members display helicase and ATPase activities and which are thought to regulate transcription of certain genes by altering the chromatin structure around those genes. The encoded protein is part of the large ATP-dependent chromatin remodeling complex SNF/SWI and contains a predicted leucine zipper motif typical of many transcription factors. Two transcript variants encoding different isoforms have been found for this gene.

== Interactions ==
SMARCC2 has been shown to interact with SMARCA4.
