= T-lymphoblastic leukemia/lymphoma =

- Other names: Precursor T-cell lymphoblastic lymphoma, Precursor T acute lymphoblastic leukemia/lymphoma
- Specialty: Hematology, oncology

T-lymphoblastic leukemia/lymphoma (WHO 2008), previously labeled precursor T-lymphoblastic leukemia/lymphoma (WHO 2001) is a form of lymphoid leukemia and lymphoma in which too many T-cell lymphoblasts (immature white blood cells) are found in the blood, bone marrow, and tissues, particularly mediastinal lymph nodes. Labeling as leukemia or lymphoma depends on which feature is more pronounced in a given situation, but has no biological or treatment implication.

It is uncommon in adults, but represents 15% of childhood acute lymphoblastic leukemia and 90% of lymphoblastic lymphoma.

The 2008 terminology dropped "precursor" to avoid linguistic redundancy because the lymphoblast is an immature precursor cell by definition.
