= SMARCA2 =

Protein-coding gene in the species Homo sapiens

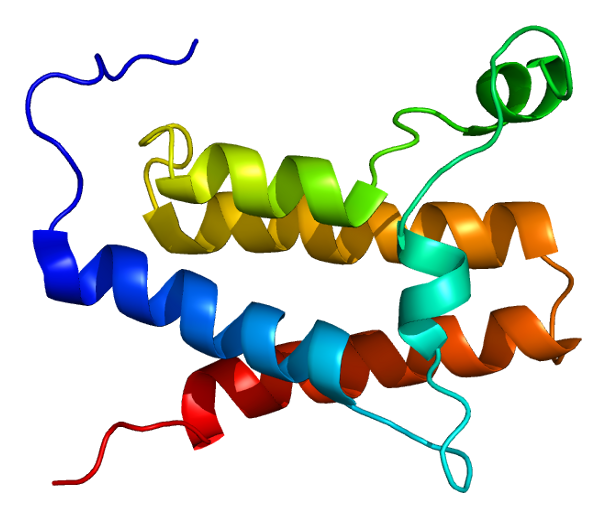

Identifiers
- Aliases: SMARCA2, BAF190, BRM, NCBRS, SNF2, SNF2L2, SNF2LA, SWI2, Sth1p, hBRM, hSNF2a, SWI/SNF related, matrix associated, actin dependent regulator of chromatin, subfamily a, member 2, BIS
- External IDs: OMIM: 600014; MGI: 99603; GeneCards: SMARCA2
Available structures
PDB	Ortholog search: PDBe RCSB
PDB	List of PDB id codes 2DAT, 5DKC, 4QY4

Gene location (Human)
Chr.	Chromosome 9 (human)
Band	9p24.3	Start	1,980,290 bp
Band	9p24.3	End	2,193,624 bp

Gene location (Mouse)
Chr.	Chromosome 19 (mouse)
Band	19 C1|19 21.17 cM	Start	26,582,450 bp
Band	19 C1|19 21.17 cM	End	26,755,722 bp
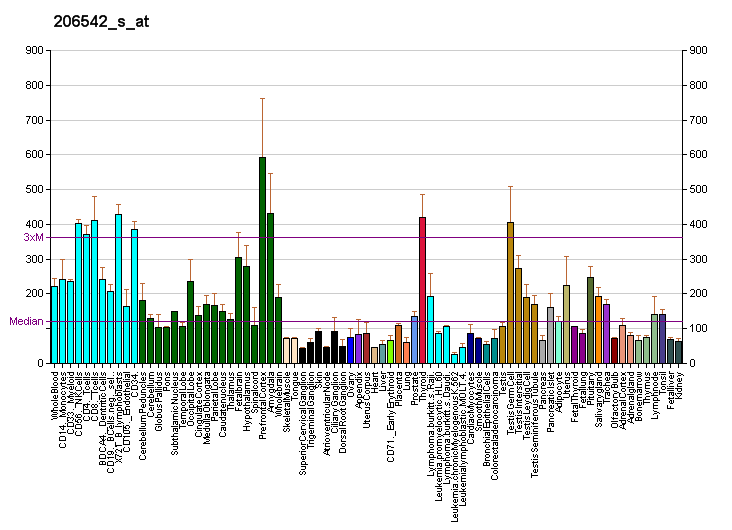

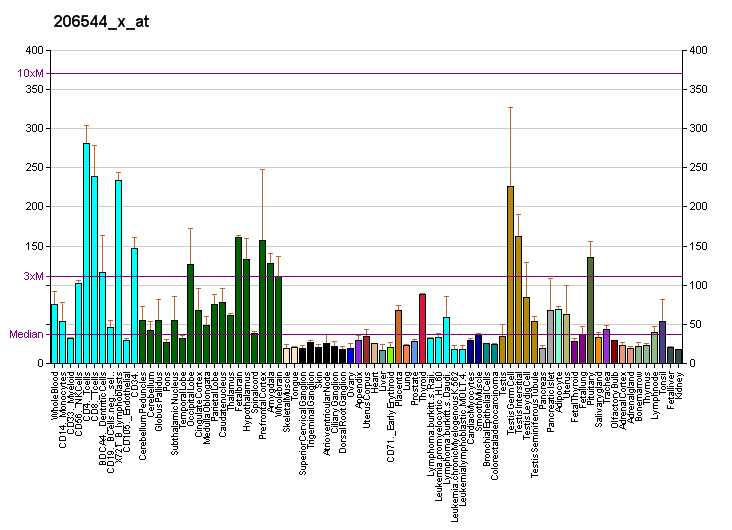

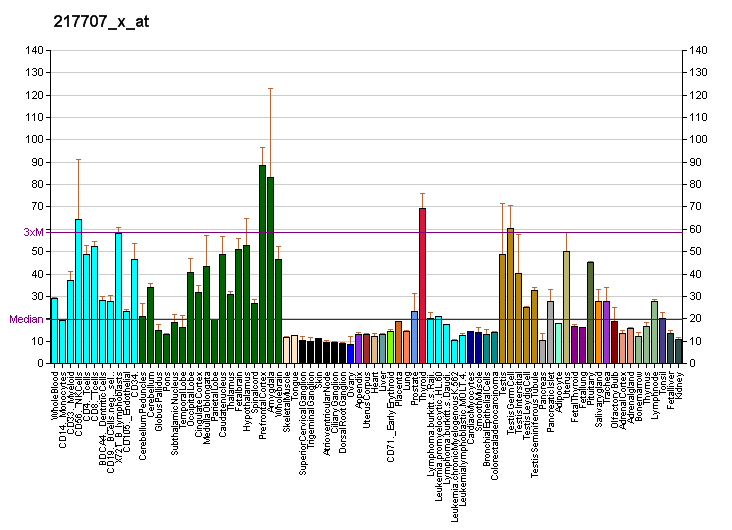
RNA expression pattern
Bgee	Human / Mouse (ortholog); Top expressed in: Achilles tendon; epithelium of colon; left ovary; ventricular zone; sural nerve; right ovary; secondary oocyte; olfactory zone of nasal mucosa; germinal epithelium; epithelium of nasopharynx / Top expressed in: neural layer of retina; lateral septal nucleus; cingulate gyrus; dentate gyrus of hippocampal formation granule cell; dorsomedial hypothalamic nucleus; cerebellar cortex; superior frontal gyrus; genital tubercle; lobe of cerebellum; cerebellar vermis; More reference expression data
BioGPS	More reference expression data
Gene ontology
Molecular function	nucleotide binding; transcription coactivator activity; DNA binding; ATP-dependent activity, acting on DNA; helicase activity; histone binding; chromatin binding; hydrolase activity, acting on acid anhydrides; protein binding; hydrolase activity; ATP binding; ATPase activity
Cellular component	nBAF complex; intracellular membrane-bounded organelle; nucleoplasm; npBAF complex; intermediate filament cytoskeleton; nucleus; SWI/SNF complex
Biological process	chromatin remodeling; regulation of transcription, DNA-templated; regulation of transcription by RNA polymerase II; negative regulation of transcription by RNA polymerase II; transcription, DNA-templated; nervous system development; positive regulation of transcription, DNA-templated; negative regulation of cell growth; spermatid development; negative regulation of transcription, DNA-templated; positive regulation of transcription by RNA polymerase II; negative regulation of cell population proliferation; transcription by RNA polymerase II
Sources:Amigo / QuickGO
Orthologs
Databases	NCBI: entry; OMA: entry
Species	Human	Mouse
Entrez	6595	67155
Ensembl	ENSG00000080503	ENSMUSG00000024921
UniProt	P51531	Q6DIC0
RefSeq (mRNA)	NM_139045; NM_001289396; NM_001289397; NM_001289398; NM_001289399 NM_001289400; NM_003070	NM_011416; NM_026003; NM_001347439
RefSeq (protein)	NP_001276325; NP_001276326; NP_001276327; NP_001276328; NP_001276329 NP_003061; NP_620614	NP_001334368; NP_035546; NP_080279; NP_001392059; NP_001392060 NP_001392061; NP_001392062; NP_001392063; NP_001392064; NP_001392065
Location (UCSC)	Chr 9: 1.98 – 2.19 Mb	Chr 19: 26.58 – 26.76 Mb
PubMed search
- Wikidata
View/Edit Human	View/Edit Mouse

Probable global transcription activator SNF2L2 is a protein that in humans is encoded by the SMARCA2 gene.

== Function ==
The protein encoded by this gene is a member of the SWI/SNF family of proteins and is highly similar to the brahma protein of Drosophila. Members of this family have helicase and ATPase activities and are thought to regulate transcription of certain genes by altering the chromatin structure around those genes. The encoded protein is part of the large ATP-dependent chromatin remodeling complex SNF/SWI, which is required for transcriptional activation of genes normally repressed by chromatin. Two transcript variants encoding different isoforms have been found for this gene, which contains a trinucleotide repeat (CAG) length polymorphism.

== Interactions ==
SMARCA2 has been shown to interact with:

- ACTL6A,
- ARID1B,
- CEBPB,
- POLR2A,
- Prohibitin,
- SIN3A,
- SMARCB1,
- SMARCC1, and
- SS18.

- Nicolaides Baraitser Syndrome (NCBRS)
