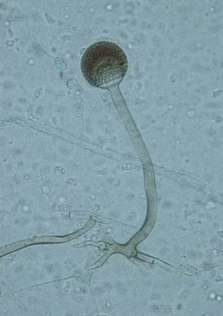
- Rhizopus microsporus sporangium containing sporangiospores

Scientific classification
- Kingdom: Fungi
- Division: Mucoromycota
- Class: Mucoromycetes
- Order: Mucorales
- Family: Mucoraceae
- Genus: Rhizopus
- Species: R. microsporus

Binomial name
- Rhizopus microsporus Tiegh. (1875)

Synonyms
- Mucor microsporus (Tiegh.) Mig. (1910); Rhizopus microsporus Tiegh. (1875)

= Rhizopus microsporus =

Species of fungus

Rhizopus microsporus is a fungal plant pathogen infecting maize, sunflower, and rice.

A domesticated variant of this species is used in the preparation of traditional soy fermentation such as tempeh and sufu (see Rhizopus oligosporus).

It can also cause a nosocomial infection and necrosis to the infected area, particularly prevalent in pre-term infants. This fungus contains the bacterial endosymbiont Paraburkholderia rhizoxinica that produces the antitumor drug rhizoxin.

== Hosts and symptoms ==
Certain strains of Rhizopus microsporus use agricultural rice as a host, causing the disease Rice Seedling Blight. This infection is first observed by the fast swelling of seedling roots, but displays no further signs of infection. The main causal agent of Rice Seedling Blight is attributed to the endosymbiotic relationship with Paraburkholderia sp. The production of rhizoxin by the bacteria inhibits the ability of rice plant cells to perform mitosis, dramatically weakening or outright killing young rice seedlings. The killing of the plant cells is beneficial to both the bacteria and the fungal host, as the two live as necrotrophic pathogens.

Rhizopus microsporus is similarly one of three common Rhizopus species to cause the disease Rhizopus Head Rot in confectionery sunflower species. Alongside R. oryzae, R. microsporus causes the premier head rot of sunflower in South Africa. Susceptibility to disease changes throughout the age of the host. Heads inoculated at the budding stage simply do not become infected. However, when inoculated at the anthesis stage, loss was relatively high. Yield was not reduced significantly when heads were inoculated at the seed development stage.

The initial symptoms appear as small, dispersed water-soaked spots on the back of the sunflower head. As the spots expand, mycelial growth expands into parenchyma cells, further killing cells within the head. Later stages of disease have external masses of mycelium among clumps of black sporangia, dispersing spores abiotically, and by birds. The diseased heads can completely rot in 3 to 7 days.

Rhizopus microsporus has been found to be the species involved in Rhizopus Ear Rot of maize as well. This is characterized by small spotted sporangia structures, mycelium growth on the ear, and eventual ear and grain rot.

== Disease cycle ==
The life cycle of R. microsporus is quite similar to the general life cycles of common Rhizopus species. The primary feature as a plant pathogen is the intake of resources from a plant host. The initial infection occurs from asexual spores overwintered in plant debris. These spores infect the host where susceptibility is best, such as young roots of rice seedlings, or the mature sunflower head. Once infected, the production of hyphae and mycelium continue to spread the infection, creating sporangia as a secondary cycle. The resources gathered are a result of the symbiotic relationship with Paraburkholderia species, allowing for rhizoxin production to kill plant cells.

A sexual stage is present, in the same fashion as most zygomycetes, with fused hyphae of alternate mating types producing a zygospore.

There is an upcoming theory that suggests that a portion of the R. microsporus reproductive cycle is replaced when put in symbiosis with the rhizoxin producing bacteria.

== Environment ==
This fungus is most commonly found in soil, plant debris, and foodstuffs. It is a pathogen of many crops and therefore is found in many diverse environments. R. microsporus is generally found in soils with a neutral pH. These soil levels usually have lower salinity for optimum growth conditions. The growth range of R. microsporus ranges from 25°C to 55°C with an optimal temperature of 28°C. Its primary host is rice and it is also commonly found in maize and sunflowers. R. microsporus causes disease in humans, one of its alternative hosts, causing infections of the lungs. In one rare case it was found tainting hospital linens in Hong Kong leading to a scare that brought the disease into the forefront of mainstream media.

== Management ==
The management of R. microsporus can be either complete sterilization, antifungal use, or the blocking of sporulation so it cannot spread. This fungal-bacterial symbiont is classified as a biosafety level 2 organism. A common method of sterilization is getting rid of all of the reproductive structures of the fungus. More difficult sterilizations oftentimes requires control agents such as antifungals are employed. However, R. microsporus is also naturally resistant to fluconazole, ketoconazole, voriconazole and the echinocandins. Antifungal prescription drugs that usually will control R. microsporus are amphotericin B and triazoles such as posaconazole, it's also occasionally susceptible to itraconazole.

Another way to control this pathogen would be to eliminate its bacterial endosymbiont; without this endosymbiont the fungus is unable to sporulate. The bacterium has a type III secretion system that allows it to communicate with its fungal host, and without the bacteria's secretion system, the fungi could not produce spores. This bacterium is passed on vertically from fungus to fungus through the sporangia while these spores are germinating. Without the bacteria none of the reproductive structures can be created by the fungus.

Preventative measures can be taken to prevent an R. microsporus infection. This includes removing potential hosts not part of the system (such as wild sunflowers) that may host pests and pathogens, controlling bird feeding, and avoiding mechanical damage to the plant after its flowering.

== Importance ==
Rhizopus microsporus causes rice seedling blight and is a severe crop disease in Asia. In addition, R. microsporus significantly affects sunflower yield in terms of both (oil) quality and quantity. The free fatty acid content of sunflower oil increases from 0.8% to 19.4%. Diseased sunflower plants also yielded only 81% as much seed and 55% as much oil.

Rhizopus microsporus is also one of very few fungi that harbors bacterial endosymbionts to control its production of toxins. Understanding the evolutionary association between R. microsporus and B. rhizoxinica and how the symbiosis is maintained has been an area of interest. In all cases, it is obvious that the fungus profits from the biosynthetic capabilities of the endosymbiont in order to access nutrient sources. Yet, the advantage for the bacterial symbiont is not evident.

Sporulation does not occur without the presence of both B. rhizoxinica and R. microsporus. The T3SS involved in this relationship is the first report on a T3SS involved in bacterial–fungal symbiosis. Phylogenetic analysis revealed that the T3SS represents a prototype of a clade of uncharacterized T3SSs within the hrp superfamily of T3SSs from plant pathogenic microorganisms.

== Pathogenesis ==
Rhizopus microsporus lives as a necrotroph where both the fungus (Rhizopus microsporus) and its harbored endobacteria (Paraburkholderia rhizoxinica) form a symbiotic relationship. In order to kill the living cells of its host, the harbored endobacteria secrete rhizoxin, a toxin that inhibits cell mitosis and vegetative production. R. microsporus has developed a resistance to the toxin due to an amino acid exchange in the β-tubulin protein. The resulting necrosis of the plant tissue replenishes nutrients to both the fungus and the bacteria by feeding on the decaying matter.

The virulence factor in all known cases are biosynthesized by the pathogenic fungus. In this case of the symbiosis between R. microsporus and B. rhizoxinica, the hosted bacteria population produces the causative agent of rice seedling blight. Toxin formation by the bacteria has been demonstrated in analogy with Koch's postulates through the discovery that rhizoxin-producing strains of R. microsporus contained symbionts. Removal of the symbionts from the host degraded rhizoxin production and the symbionts were then grown in pure culture. Lastly, the re-introduction of the bacteria grown in pure culture back into the host reestablished rhizoxin production.

The maintenance of the symbiosis is crucial for sporulation to occur. The endofungal bacteria possess a type III secretion system (T3SS) in order to achieve symbiosis. Mutants defective in the T3SS mechanism show reduced intracellular survival and no sporulation. This T3SS is a pathogenicity factor that is required by the pathogen in order to cause disease.
