= Mycetohabitans =

Scientific classification
- Domain: Bacteria
- Kingdom: Pseudomonadati
- Phylum: Pseudomonadota
- Class: Betaproteobacteria
- Order: Burkholderiales
- Family: Burkholderiaceae
- Genus: Mycetohabitans; Estrada-de Los Santos et al. 2018

Type species
- Burkholderia rhizoxinica Partida-Martinez et al. 2007

Species
- M. endofungorum (Partida-Martinez et al. 2007) Estrada-de Los Santos et al. 2018; M. rhizoxinica (Partida-Martinez et al. 2007) Estrada-de Los Santos et al. 2018

Genus of bacteria

Mycetohabitans is a genus of gram-negative motile bacteria.

== Species ==
The genus Mycetohabitans includes the following species:

- Mycetohabitans endofungorum (Partida-Martinez et al. 2007) Estrada-de Los Santos et al. 2018
- Mycetohabitans rhizoxinica (Partida-Martinez et al. 2007) Estrada-de Los Santos et al. 2018
