= Mycetohabitans rhizoxinica =

Scientific classification
- Domain: Bacteria
- Kingdom: Pseudomonadati
- Phylum: Pseudomonadota
- Class: Betaproteobacteria
- Order: Burkholderiales
- Family: Burkholderiaceae
- Genus: Mycetohabitans
- Species: M. rhizoxinica

Binomial name
- Mycetohabitans rhizoxinica (Partida-Martinez et al. 2007) Estrada-de Los Santos et al. 2018

Type strain
- CIP 109453; DSM 19002; HKI 454

Synonyms
- "Burkholderia rhizoxina" Scherlach et al. 2006; Burkholderia rhizoxinica Partida-Martinez et al. 2007; Paraburkholderia rhizoxinica (Partida-Martinez et al. 2007) Sawana et al. 2015

Species of bacterium

Mycetohabitans rhizoxinica is a gram-negative, oxidase and catalase-positive, motile bacterium in the family Burkholderiaceae which was isolated from the plant pathogenic fungus, Rhizopus microsporus. The complete genome of Mycetohabitans rhizoxinica is sequenced.
