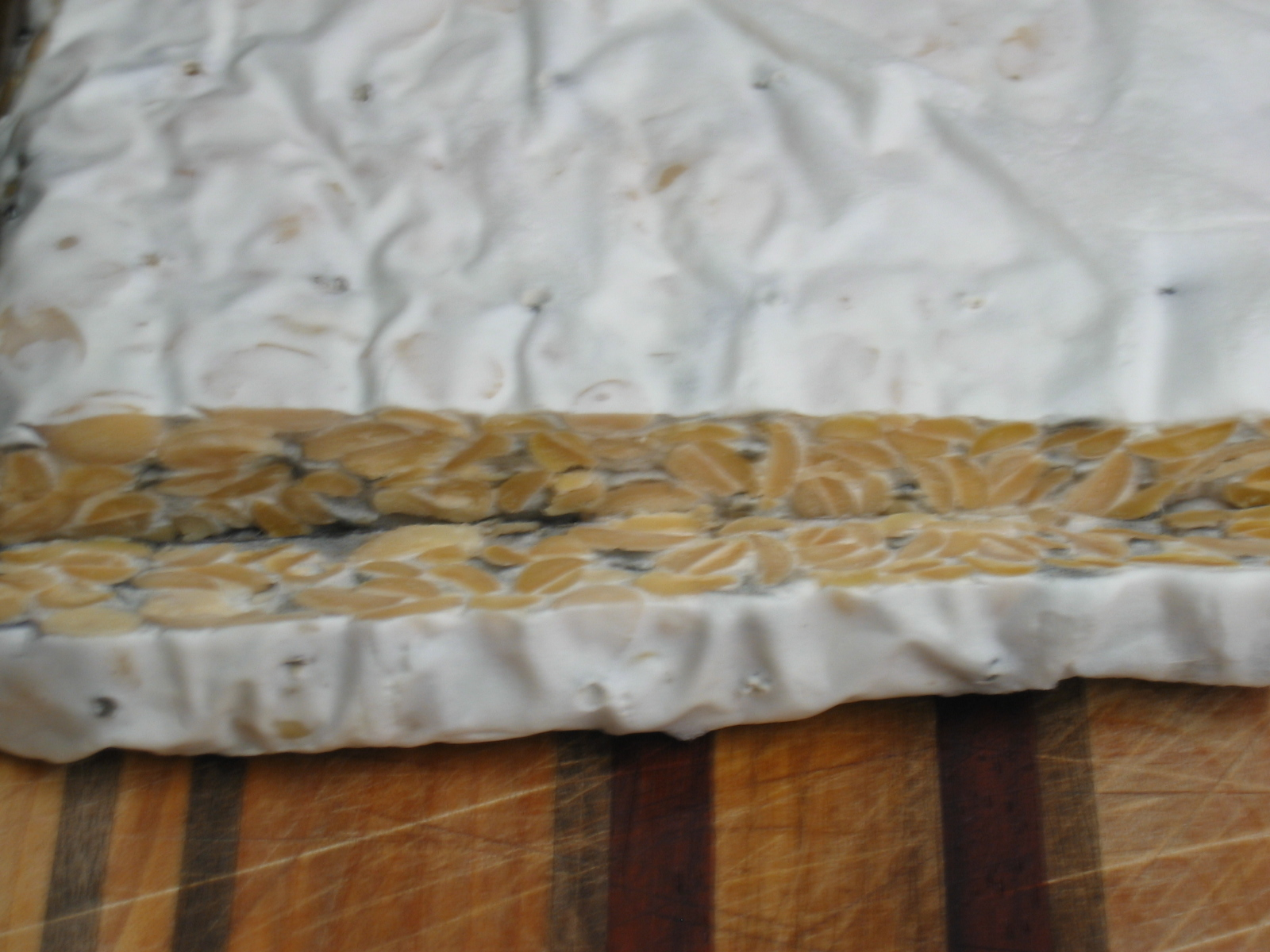
- White layer of Rhizopus oligosporus on homemade tempeh

Scientific classification
- Kingdom: Fungi
- Division: Mucoromycota
- Class: Mucoromycetes
- Order: Mucorales
- Family: Mucoraceae
- Genus: Rhizopus
- Species: R. oligosporus

Binomial name
- Rhizopus oligosporus Saito

= Rhizopus oligosporus =

Species of fungus

Rhizopus oligosporus is a fungus of the family Mucoraceae and is a widely used starter culture for the production of tempeh at home and industrially. As the mold grows it produces fluffy, white mycelia, binding the beans together to create an edible "cake" of partly catabolized soybeans. The domestication of the microbe is thought to have occurred in Indonesia several centuries ago.

R. oligosporus is the preferred starter culture for tempeh production for several reasons. It grows effectively in the warm temperatures (30–40 °C or 85–105 °F) which are typical of the Indonesian islands; it exhibits strong lipolytic and proteolytic activity, creating desirable properties in tempeh; and it produces metabolites that allow it to inhibit and thus outcompete other molds and gram-positive bacteria, including the potentially harmful Aspergillus flavus and Staphylococcus aureus.

R. oligosporus is at present considered to be a domesticated form of Rhizopus microsporus, resulting in a synonym of Rhizopus microsporus var. oligosporus. R. microsporus produces several potentially toxic metabolites, rhizoxin and rhizonins A and B, but it appears the domestication and mutation of the R. oligosporus genome has led to the loss of genetic material responsible for toxin production. The synonym is not currently recognized in fungal taxonomy, so its current taxonomic position is best described as a member of the R. microsporus species group.

== Properties ==
Rhizopus oligosporus is a fungus that belongs to the class Mucoromycetes, which is one of two classes in the phylum Mucoromycota. Rhizopus oligosporus belongs to the Rhizopus microsporus group. This group is made of taxa with similar morphology that are associated with undesired metabolite production, pathogenesis and food fermentation. Although other varieties in Rhizopus microsporus may be harmful, Rhizopus oligosporus is not associated with production of potentially harmful metabolites. It is a domesticated species and is only 'native' in human environs.

Rhizopus oligosporus strains have a large diameter (up to 43 μm) and irregular spores with widely varying volume, (typically in the range 96–223 mm^{3}). Rhizopus oligosporus has large, subglobose to globose spores, and high proportion irregular spores (>10 %). Rhizopus oligosporus also has spores with nonparallel valleys and ridges, and plateaus that sometimes are granular.

=== Metabolites ===
The fungus does not produce metabolites that are harmful to humans.

Even after it is consumed, Rhizopus oligosporus produces an antimicrobial peptide that limits gram-positive bacteria like Staphylococcus aureus and Bacillus subtilis. It also produces an antifungal in the form of a chitinase protein.

== Uses ==
=== Fermentation ===
Tempeh, a popular Indonesian food, is created by fermenting soybeans with Rhizopus oligosporus. To create tempeh, soybeans first must be soaked in water (usually overnight) at a temperature similar to the environment in which it is placed. The soybean's outer covering is then removed, and the beans are partially cooked. Lactic acid bacteria, like Lactococcus and Lb. casei species, play a major role in the fermentation of tempeh. For the tempeh to ferment, there needs to be a suitable, pure inoculum. Also needed are spores that germinate quickly. For the tempeh to attain its characteristic, compact, 'cake' form after fermentation, the soybeans become compressed by the mycelia of Rhizopus oligosporus. Rapidly growing mycelia help speed the growth of this fungus. Because mycelia are sensitive to dehydration and adverse temperatures, preserving tempeh for extended periods can be challenging. When the soybeans are bound together by the white mycelium, the fungus releases enzymes that can digest protein. Many times, a good inoculum for this new fermentation comes from small pieces of old tempeh that have fermented.

The fungus can ferment cereals and legumes other than soy, producing oncom. Wheat and rice may be used.

=== Industrial use ===
This fungus has been used to treat waste and wastewater and produce industrial enzymes.

This fungus can be grown for phytase, an animal feed additive that breaks down the antinutrient phytic acid.

== See also ==
- Aspergillus oryzae
- Medicinal molds
- Saccharomyces boulardii
- Saccharomyces cerevisiae
