= Mycetohabitans endofungorum =

Scientific classification
- Domain: Bacteria
- Kingdom: Pseudomonadati
- Phylum: Pseudomonadota
- Class: Betaproteobacteria
- Order: Burkholderiales
- Family: Burkholderiaceae
- Genus: Mycetohabitans
- Species: M. endofungorum

Binomial name
- Mycetohabitans endofungorum (Partida-Martinez et al. 2007) Estrada-de Los Santos et al. 2018

Type strain
- CIP 109454; DSM 19003; HKI 456

Synonyms
- Burkholderia endofungorum Partida-Martinez et al. 2007; Paraburkholderia endofungorum (Partida-Martinez et al. 2007) Sawana et al. 2015

Species of bacterium

Mycetohabitans endofungorum is a gram-negative, catalase and oxidase-positive, motile bacterium in the family Burkholderiaceae. It is able to grow under aerobic and microaerophilic conditions without a CO_{2} atmosphere.
