= Tempeh =

Soy product from Java, Indonesia

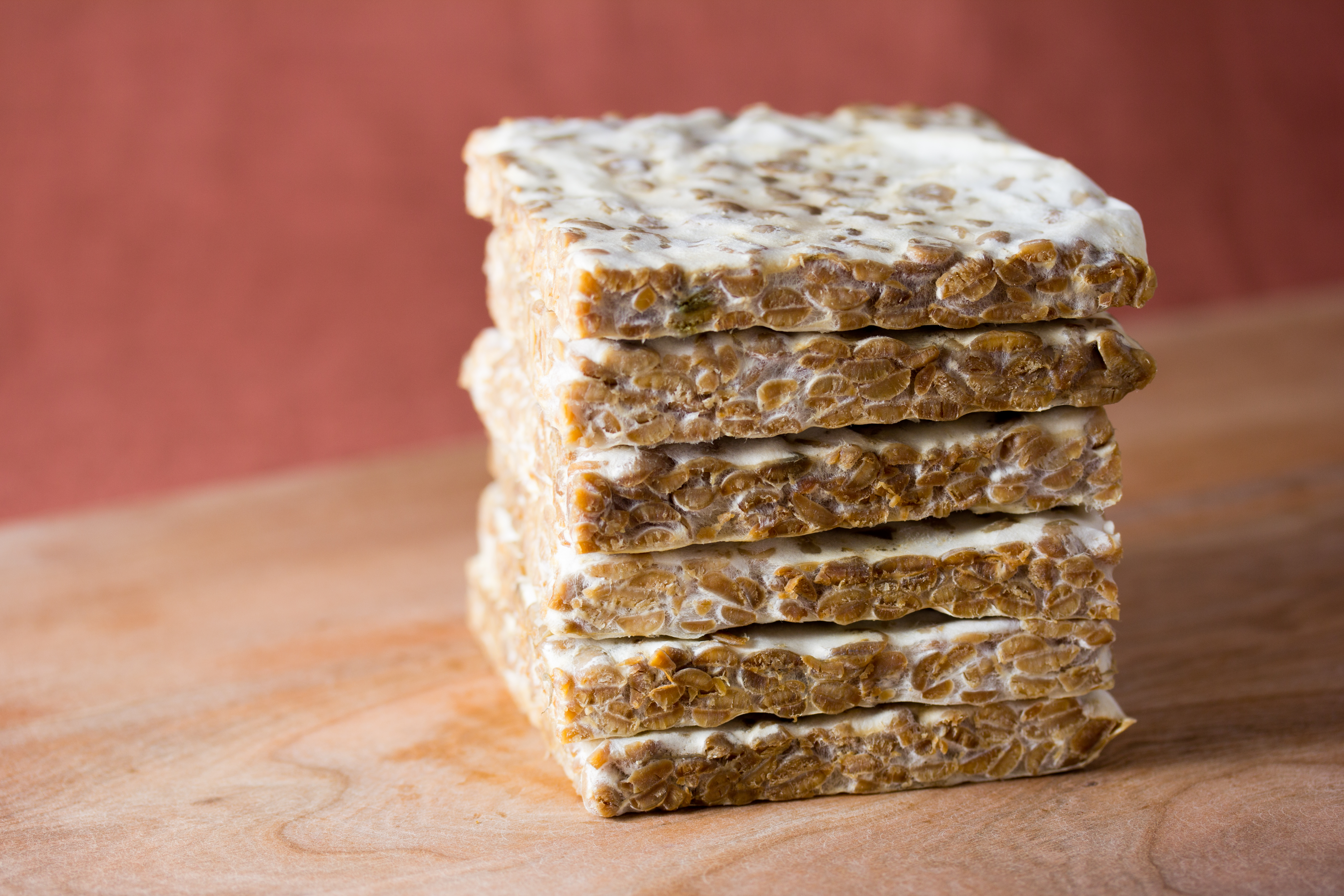
- Fresh tempeh
- Alternative names: Tempe
- Place of origin: Indonesia
- Region or state: Java
- Created by: Javanese cuisine
- Main ingredients: Soybeans, Fermentation starter (Rhizopus spp.)

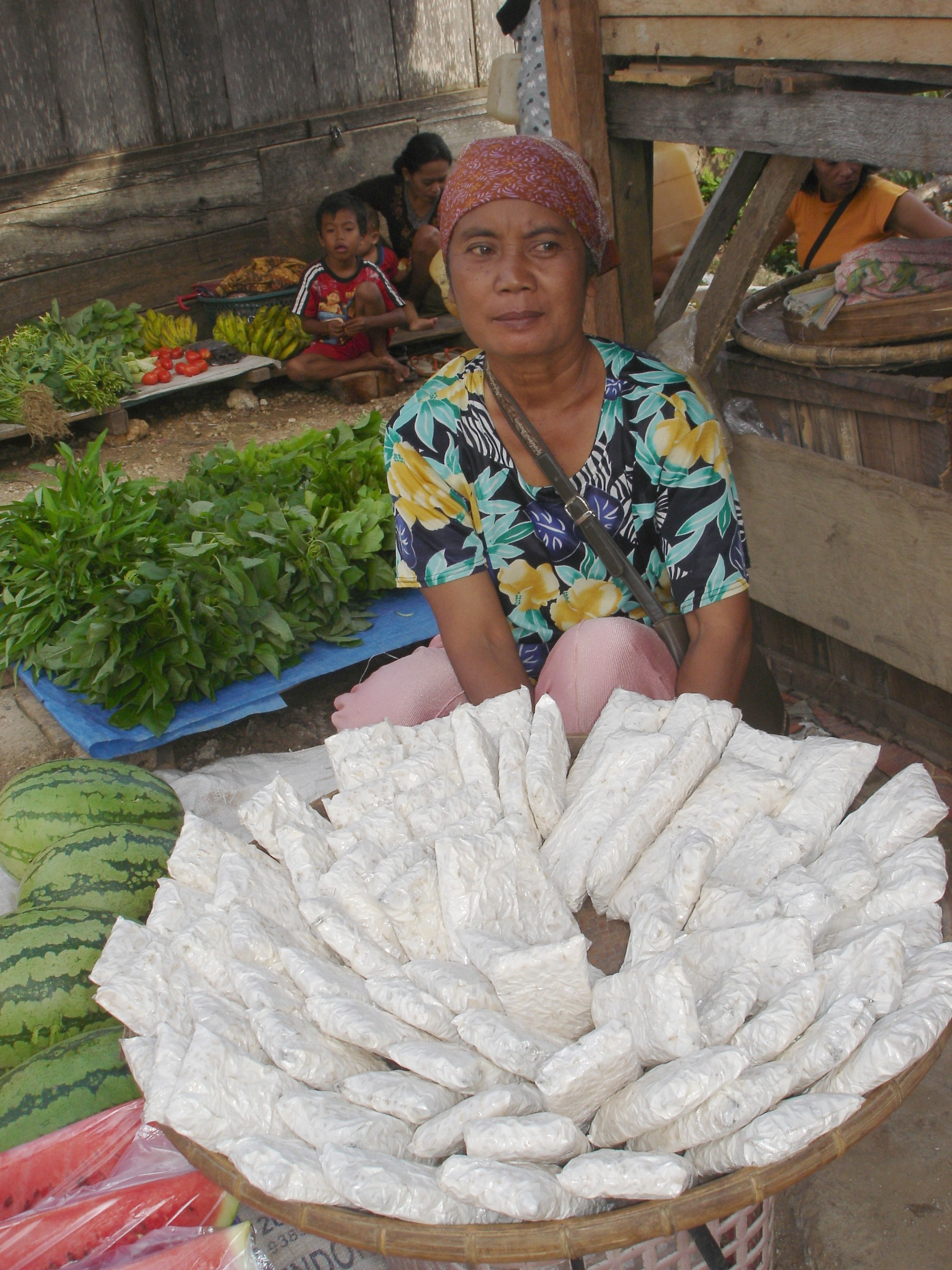
Tempeh being sold in a traditional market in Indonesia

Tempeh or tempe (/ˈtɛmpeɪ/; Javanese: ꦠꦺꦩ꧀ꦥꦺ, romanized: témpé, Javanese pronunciation: [tempe]) is a traditional Indonesian food made from fermented soybeans. It is made by a natural culturing and controlled fermentation process that binds soybeans into a cake form. A fungus, Rhizopus oligosporus or Rhizopus oryzae, is used in the fermentation process and is also known as tempeh starter.

It is native of the island of Java, where it is a staple source of protein. Like tofu, tempeh is made from soybeans, but it is a whole-soybean product with different nutritional characteristics and textural qualities. Tempeh's fermentation process and its retention of the whole bean give it a higher content of protein, dietary fiber, and vitamins. It has a firm texture and an earthy flavor, which becomes more pronounced as it ages.

== Etymology ==
The term tempe is thought to be derived from the Old Javanese tumpi, a whitish food made of fried batter made from sago or rice flour which resembles rempeyek. The historian Denys Lombard also suggests that it could be linked to a later term tape or tapai which means 'fermentation'.

In the western world, tempeh rather than tempe is the most common spelling, to emphasise that the final "e" is pronounced. The first known usage of this spelling is in an 1896 German article. Other spellings, such as témpé, were also used, but tempeh has become the standard spelling in English since the 1960s.

== History ==
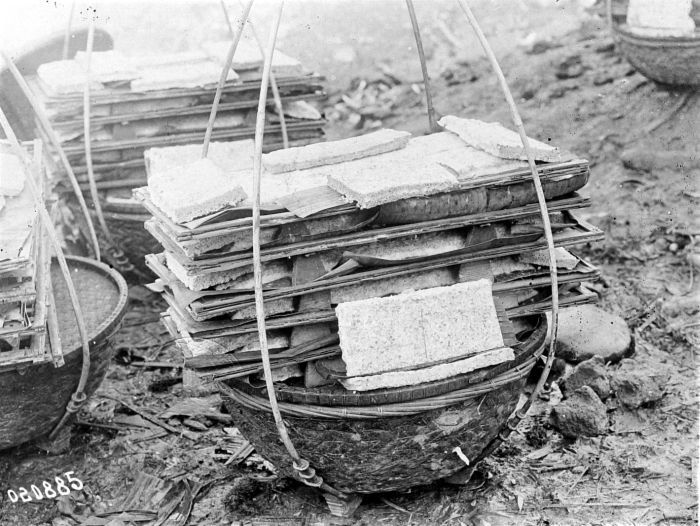
Tempeh being sold in Java, early 20th century

Tempeh originated in Indonesia. According to historical evidence, tempeh was first made in Bayat, Klaten, Central Java, and was commonly consumed around 1700.

The invention of tempeh seems to have arisen through the serendipitous introduction to stored soybeans of the fungus, which is crucial in tempeh's fermentation. This fungus grows on teakwood and sea hibiscus leaves, which native Javanese people often used (and still do) as food wrappings. In fact, in traditional tempeh making, an usar (a mycelium-filled leaf) is used, instead of store-bought ragi.

The type of soybean first used to make tempeh was the black soybean, which was a native plant. This later changed with the importation of white or yellow soybeans and the rise of the tofu industry on the island.

While tempeh has not been prominent far from its region of origin, it was reported to have "suddenly taken off" in the United Kingdom in 2025, with annual sales of one brand increasing by 736% (and another by 128%). In North America, a compound growth rate of 6.1% is expected in the tempeh market from 2024 to 2030, reaching $1519.8 million by 2030.

=== Debate over origins ===
Murdijati Gardjito, a food historian at Gadjah Mada University, argued that tempeh was made by native Javanese people and that its preparation predates the introduction of Chinese-style tofu products. Some ancient texts mention tempe dhele, old Javanese for 'native soybean tempeh'; dhele was used to refer to the native soybean variety. White soybeans that are used to make most tempe dhele today used to be called dhele putih ('white soybeans'), and were only available in Java centuries later. Mary Astuti, a food historian at Gadjah Mada University specializing in tempeh, argued that the native variety of soybean had been grown before the Chinese arrived in the region.

Sri Tandjung noted that Javanese had been eating cooked (native black) soybeans since the 12th century. By the 16th or the 19th century, depending on which period of time the writer of Serat Centhini referred to, Javanese people had mastered the art of cooking with tempeh, when it was not only eaten as is, but converted into different types of dishes, showing a full understanding and mastery of the food product.

Gardjito noted that Javanese noble families rarely wrote about tempeh in ancient texts because it had never been a part of royal cuisine, but rather a staple food of the lower classes.

Indonesian historian Ong Hok Ham suggests that tempeh might have been produced as a byproduct of tahu, the Indonesian word for tofu. He argued that the two food products are made of the same ingredient and that genetically speaking, soybeans are from China, though the specific variety was never mentioned. Food journalist Andreas Maryoto supported this idea, saying that tempeh might have been accidentally produced as the by-product of the tofu industry in Java in the 17th century, as discarded soybeans caught the spores of a whitish fungus that was found to be edible. In 2025, Zaelani formalized this as the "Okara-Tempe Hypothesis", proposing that tempeh originated from okara (tofu residue) that was naturally fermented before being adapted to whole soybeans.

However, tahu was (and is still) made of white soybeans (Glycine max, native to Japan and China), as opposed to the earliest version of tempe dhele that was made of native black soybeans (Glycine soja).

Tahu (tofu) made its way to Kediri in the 13th century and was consumed by the Mongolians who arrived in Java. Later, it was popular only among the rich (the complex production process and imported white soybeans led to its high price). Around the 17th or 19th century, tahu became available to everyone.

Tempeh later began to be made with white soybeans, leading to the decreased use of its native black variety. Black soybeans have been replaced by other commodity plants since. The original version of tempe dhele has been forgotten as tahu has become the common people's food, and dependence on imported white soybeans grows.

== Production ==
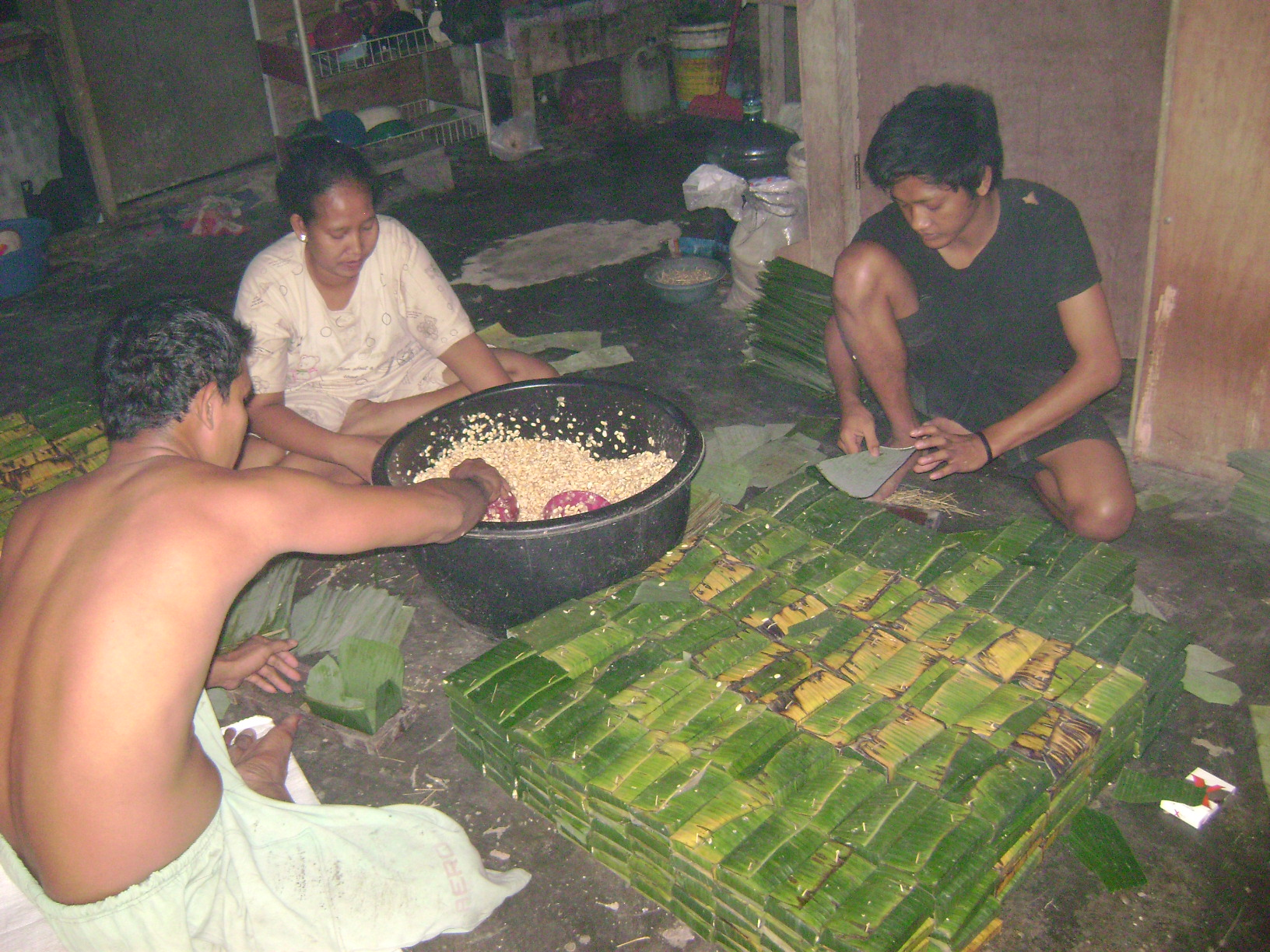
Making tempeh by wrapping boiled soybeans in banana leaves

Tempeh begins with whole soybeans, which are softened by soaking, dehulled, then partly cooked. Specialty tempeh may be made from other types of beans, wheat, or may include a mixture of beans and whole grains. Adding vinegar during soybeans soaking process had also been reported in tempeh industries and it had been found to influence the sensory nature of the final product.

The principal step in making tempeh is the fermentation of soybeans which undergo inoculation with Rhizopus spp. molds, a type of filamentous fungus most widely used for the production of tempeh. A fermentation starter containing the spores of fungus Rhizopus oligosporus or Rhizopus oryzae is mixed in. The beans are spread into a thin layer and are allowed to ferment for 24 to 36 hours at a temperature around 30°C (86°F). The soybeans have to cool down to allow spore germination and abundant growth of mycelium. Later, the temperature of the beans will naturally rise and rapid mold growth happens for around 4 hours. As mold growth declines, the soybeans should be bound into a solid mass by the mycelium. In good tempeh, the beans are knitted together by a mat of white mycelium. Typically, tempeh is harvested after 48 hours of fermentation with its distinguishable whitish color, firm texture, and nutty flavor. Extended fermentation time results in an increase in pH and undesirable color darkening in the tempeh.

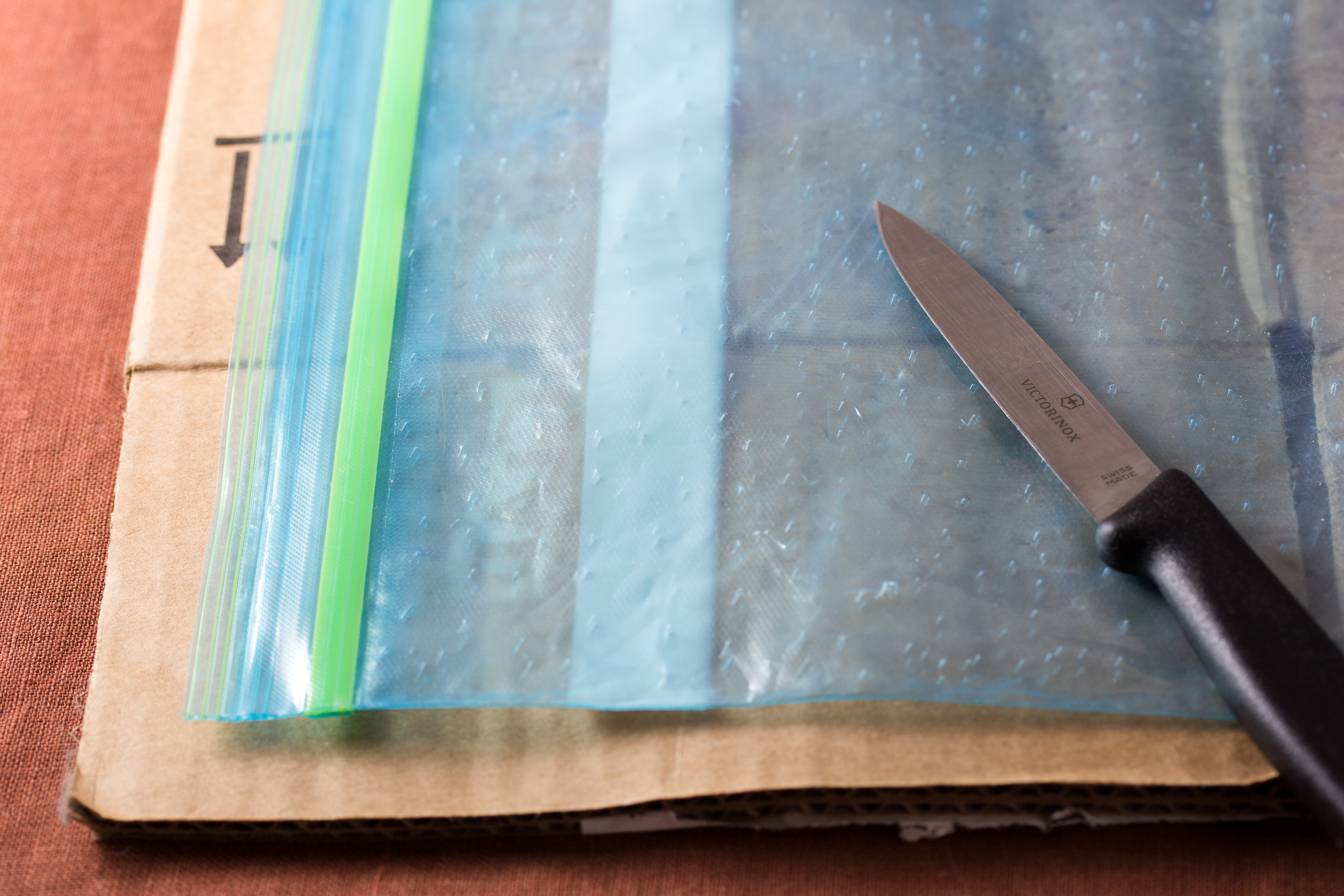
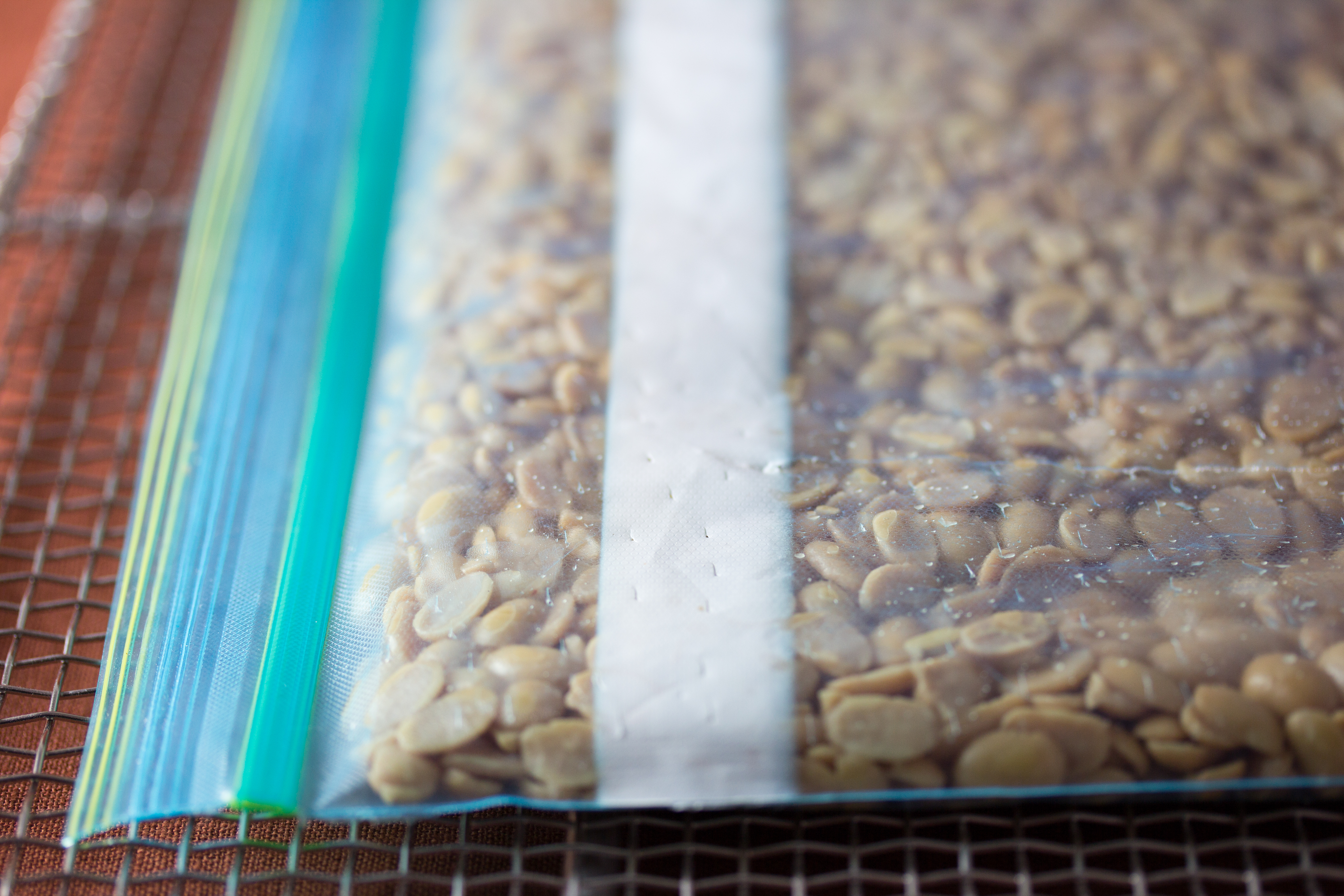
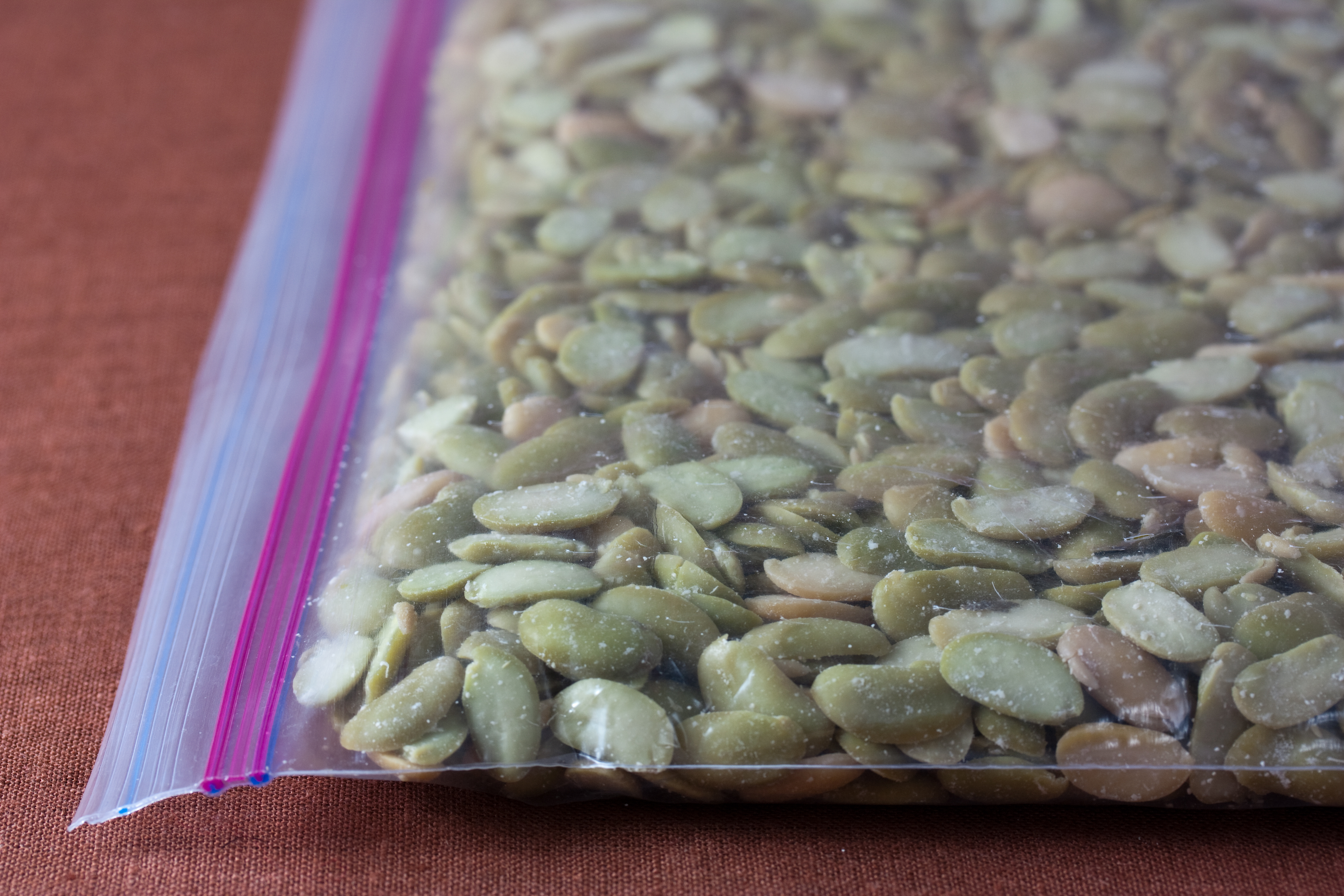
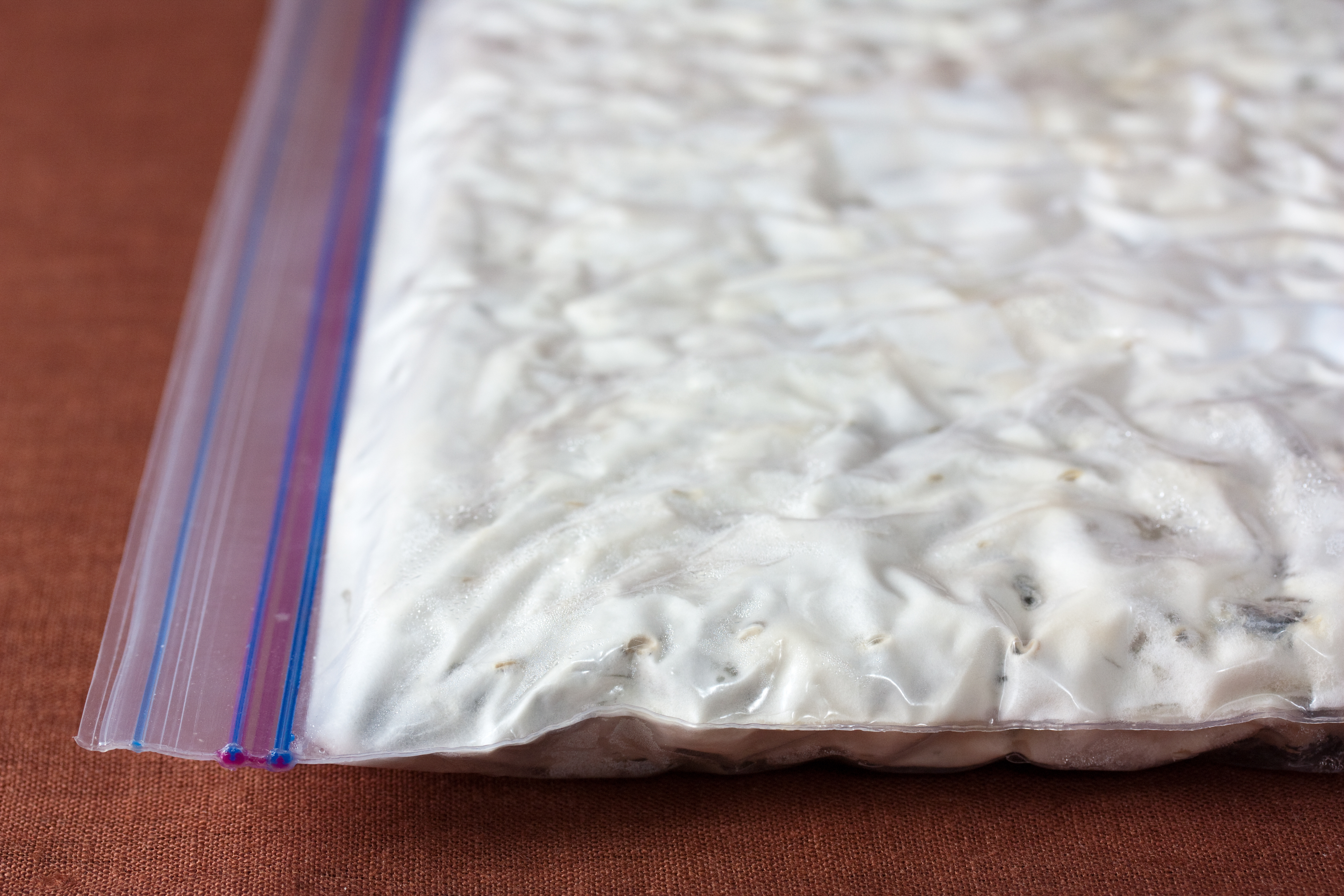
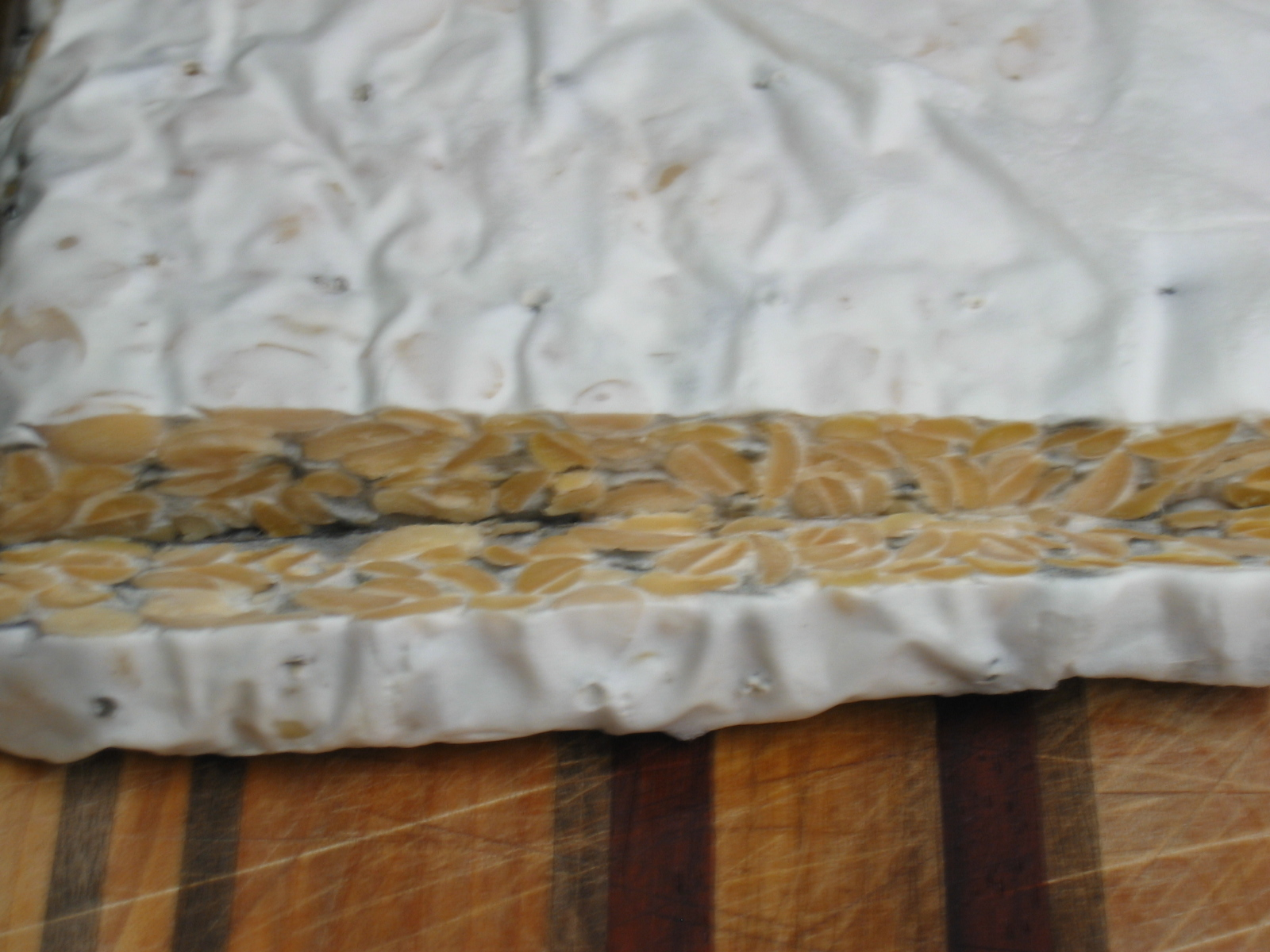
Tempeh-making process using tempeh bag of sealed polyethylene pouch, soybeans prior to fermentation, after fermentation, and result

During the fermentation process, optimal time of fermentation, temperature, oxygen, humidity, and pH levels are required to encourage the growth of the Rhizopus mold, while discouraging the growth of undesired microorganisms. The pH level should be kept around 3–5 by adding a mild acidulant such as vinegar, lactic acid, or acetic acid, thereby favoring mold growth and restricting the growth of spoilage microorganisms. Oxygen is required for Rhizopus spp. growth, but should be maintained at low levels to prevent the production of undesired microorganisms. Under conditions of lower temperature, or higher ventilation, gray or black patches of spores may form on the surface—this is not harmful, and should not affect the flavor or quality of the tempeh. This sporulation is normal on fully mature tempeh. A mild ammonia smell may accompany good tempeh as it ferments, but it should not be overpowering.

Traditional tempeh is often produced in Indonesia using Hibiscus tiliaceus leaves. The undersides of the leaves are covered in downy hairs (known technically as trichomes) to which the mold Rhizopus oligosporus can be found adhering in the wild. Soybeans are pressed into the leaf, and stored. Fermentation occurs resulting in tempeh. In particular, the tempeh undergoes salt-free aerobic fermentation.

Tempeh made with traditional inoculation methods are also more likely to include molds of other species including Rhizopus arrhizus and Rhizopus delemar which may outcompete Rhizopus oligosporus as the dominant mold. This results in white woolly appearance and more pleasant aroma compared with tempeh made with commercial starter containing only Rhizopus oligosporus. Famously these variant tempeh are found in Malang and Purwokerto in the 1960s, because Malang is located in a cool plateau, and tempeh made with Rhizopus oligosporus resulted in less compact and more alcoholic-smelling tempeh, while Rhizopus arrhizus required lower optimum temperature which made it more ideal. However the widespread use of commercial starter resulted in most tempeh in Java only containing Rhizopus oligosporus, with few traditionally made tempeh outside Java still containing Rhizopus arrhizus and Rhizopus delemar.

=== Dry matter losses and yield ===
During the processing of soybeans to make tempeh there are inevitable losses of material due to the removal of the hulls and the leaching of soluble compounds during the soaking, washing and cooking stages. Hulls constitute about 8% of the dry beans and losses due to the leaching of soluble compounds equate to 12–17% of the dry beans. The oligosaccharides, stachyose, raffinose and sucrose, can constitute up to 50% of the soluble materials lost. During the fermentation there is some further loss of material due to respiration by the mold and the oxidation of compounds to carbon dioxide and water. Reported losses of dry matter during the fermentation range from 2.1 to 10%. Hence, the overall yield of tempeh is in the range of 72–78 g tempeh per 100 g soybeans on a dry matter basis. In practical terms, this means that 100 g dry soybeans (7–9% moisture content) will yield about 170 to 210 g fresh tempeh (61–64% moisture content).

=== Determining quality ===
Once tempeh is produced, it is divided into three categories based on its quality: good, unfinished, and inedible. Good tempeh includes beans that are bound into a firm, compact cake by a dense, uniform, white mycelium, which should permeate the entire cake; the beans should be barely visible. The odor of good tempeh should be pleasant, clean, subtly sweet or resemble the aroma of mushrooms. The entire tempeh should lift as a single, cohesive cake without crumbling when shaken gently. Unfinished tempeh has beans that are bound together loosely by a sparse white mycelium, hence it crumbles easily. Unfinished tempeh should be incubated longer unless it has been incubated more than eight hours past the recommended time. If it has been incubated for enough time and still remains unfinished, it should be discarded. Inedible tempeh has beans with foul odor, resembling strong ammonia or alcohol, indicating the development of undesirable bacteria due to excess moisture or overheating. Inedible tempeh cake is wet, slimy, and mushy with a collapsed structure. Its color is tan to brown and mold develops in sparse patches.

=== Packaging ===
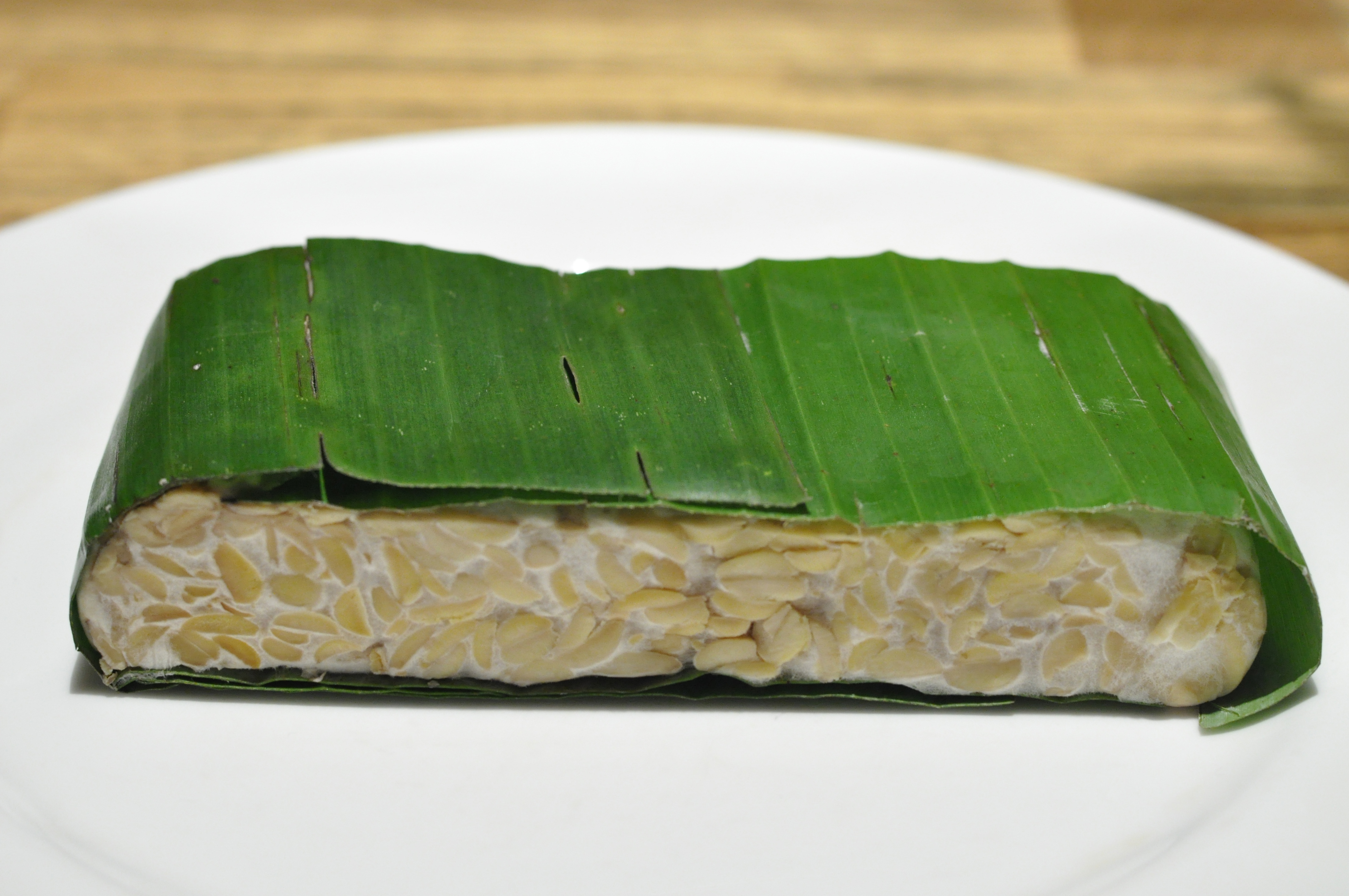
Tempeh traditionally wrapped in banana leaf

Food grade wrapping paper and perforated polyethylene bags are the most suitable materials for packaging tempeh. They have demonstrated good retention of the quality of tempeh and extension of the shelf life of tempeh for three days compared to fresh tempeh. Appropriate packaging is important as it provides optimum oxygen supply and temperature for inoculation and fermentation to occur during processing. Tempeh is a perishable food and must be wrapped and placed into the refrigerator or freezer immediately after incubation or other processing steps such as blanching. In the refrigerator or freezer, stacking of tempeh should be minimized to prevent overheating and the undesirable, gradual continuation of fermentation, both of which shorten the storage life of tempeh. Even under cold temperature, tempeh continues to respire and undergo slow decomposition from microorganisms and its natural enzymes. Therefore, tempeh should be well cooled for at least two to five hours in a cooler before it undergoes further packaging. Tempeh packaged in perforated polyethylene bags is usually repacked inside another labeled, non-perforated bag for distribution, sale and easier labeling. If the tempeh is packaged in only one perforated bag, the label must be directly attached to the perforated surface with the use of government food contact approved adhesive. It is then bulk packed in cartons and returned to the refrigerator or freezer to await shipment.

== Nutrition ==
Tempeh
Nutritional value per 100 g (3.5 oz)
- Energy: 803 kJ (192 kcal)
- Carbohydrates: 7.64 g
- Fat: 10.80 g
- Protein: 20.29 g
Vitamins and minerals
Vitamins	Quantity %DV^{†}
Thiamine (B1)	7% 0.078 mg
Riboflavin (B2)	28% 0.358 mg
Niacin (B3)	17% 2.640 mg
Vitamin B6	13% 0.215 mg
Folate (B9)	6% 24 μg
Vitamin B12	3% 0.08 μg
Minerals	Quantity %DV^{†}
Calcium	9% 111 mg
Iron	15% 2.7 mg
Magnesium	19% 81 mg
Manganese	57% 1.3 mg
Phosphorus	21% 266 mg
Potassium	14% 412 mg
Sodium	0% 9 mg
Zinc	10% 1.14 mg
- Other constituents: Quantity
- Water: 60 g
- Full Link to USDA Database entry
- ^{†}Percentages estimated using US recommendations for adults, except for potassium, which is estimated based on expert recommendation from the National Academies.

Tempeh is 60% water, 20% protein, 8% carbohydrates, and 11% fats (table). In a reference amount of 100 grams (3.5 oz), tempeh supplies 192 calories, and is a rich source (20% or more of the Daily Value, DV) of several B vitamins and dietary minerals, such as riboflavin (30% DV) and manganese (62% DV), respectively (table).

=== Effects of fermentation ===
The soy carbohydrates in tempeh become more digestible as a result of the fermentation process. In particular, the oligosaccharides associated with flatulence and indigestion are greatly reduced by the Rhizopus culture. In traditional tempeh-making shops, the starter culture often contains bacteria that produce vitamins such as B_{12} (though it is uncertain whether this B_{12} is always present and bioavailable).

In western countries, it is more common to use a pure culture containing only Rhizopus oligosporus, which makes little B_{12} and could be missing Citrobacter freundii and Klebsiella pneumoniae, which have been shown to produce significant levels of B_{12} analogs in tempeh when present.

Studies of fortifying tempeh with vitamin B_{12} through fermentation using microorganisms indicate that lactic acid bacteria and propionic acid bacteria produce vitamin B_{12}.

== Preparation ==
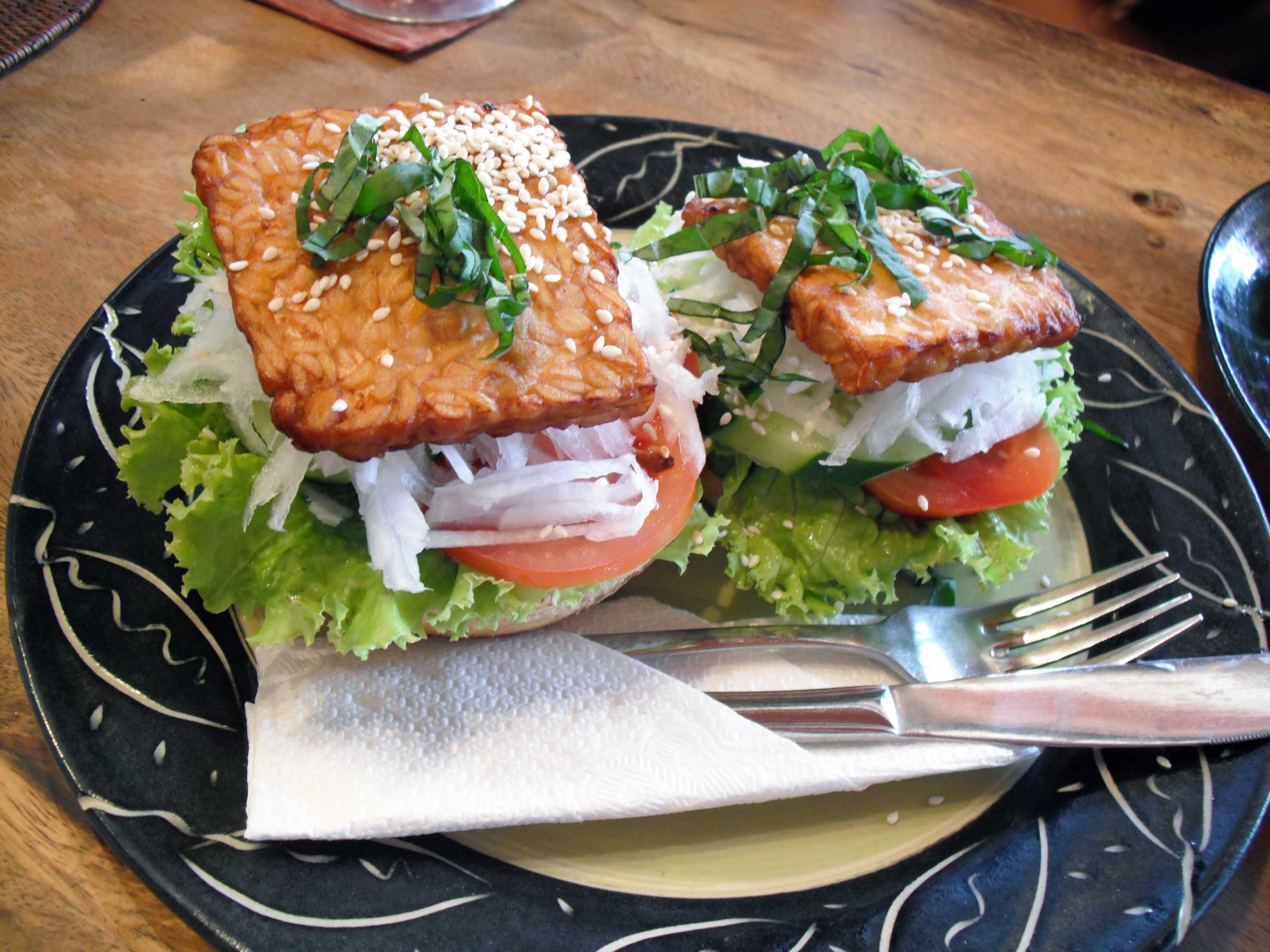
Tempeh burger

In the kitchen, tempeh is often simply prepared by cutting it into pieces, soaking in brine or a salty sauce, and then fried. In Java, tempeh is often traditionally prepared by cutting it into pieces, marinating it in a mixture of ground garlic, coriander, turmeric, salt and water; then deep fried, and it's often served with sambal ulek chili paste. Cooked tempeh can be eaten alone, or used in chili, stir fries, soups, salads, sandwiches, and stews. Tempeh's complex flavor has been described as nutty, meaty, and mushroom-like. It freezes well, and is now commonly available in many western supermarkets, as well as in ethnic markets and health food stores. Tempeh can be steamed, marinated, thinly sliced, blackened, or crumbled into sauces and stews.

Tempeh performs well in a cheese grater, after which it may be used in place of ground beef (as in tacos). When thin-sliced and deep-fried in oil, tempeh obtains a crisp golden crust while maintaining a soft interior. Its sponge-like consistency makes it suitable for marinating. Dried tempeh (whether cooked or raw) is more portable and less perishable and may be used as a stew base. Sometimes when tempeh is diced and left, it will create white feathery fluff which bonds the cut—this is the Rhizopus mold still growing—this is normal and perfectly edible.

== Types ==
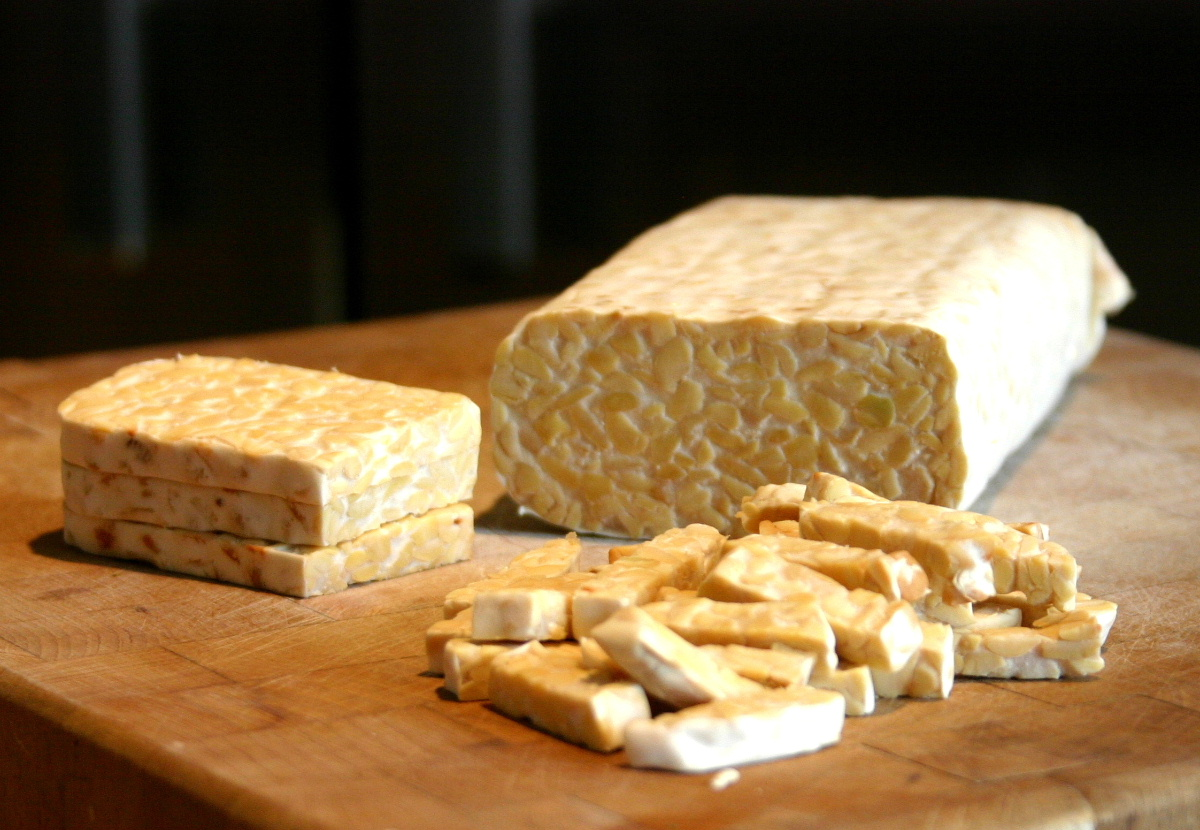
Sliced tempe kedelai (soy tempeh)

The most common and widely known tempeh is made from fermented soybeans, called tempeh kedele or tempeh dele, made from controlled fermentation of soybeans. However, traditionally other ingredients such as ampas tahu (tofu dregs/okara), ampas kelapa (coconut dregs) and peanuts may be used in a fashion similar to the tempeh-making process, although perhaps using different fungi or attracting other microbes like kara benguk or kara pedhang, which can be toxic if not prepared correctly. A related product to tempeh is oncom, which is made from peanut press cake or soy dregs and is prevalent in Sundanese culture in West Java. There are two types of oncom: a bright red-orange kind with Neurospora sitophila, and a black one with the same fungi as tempeh uses.

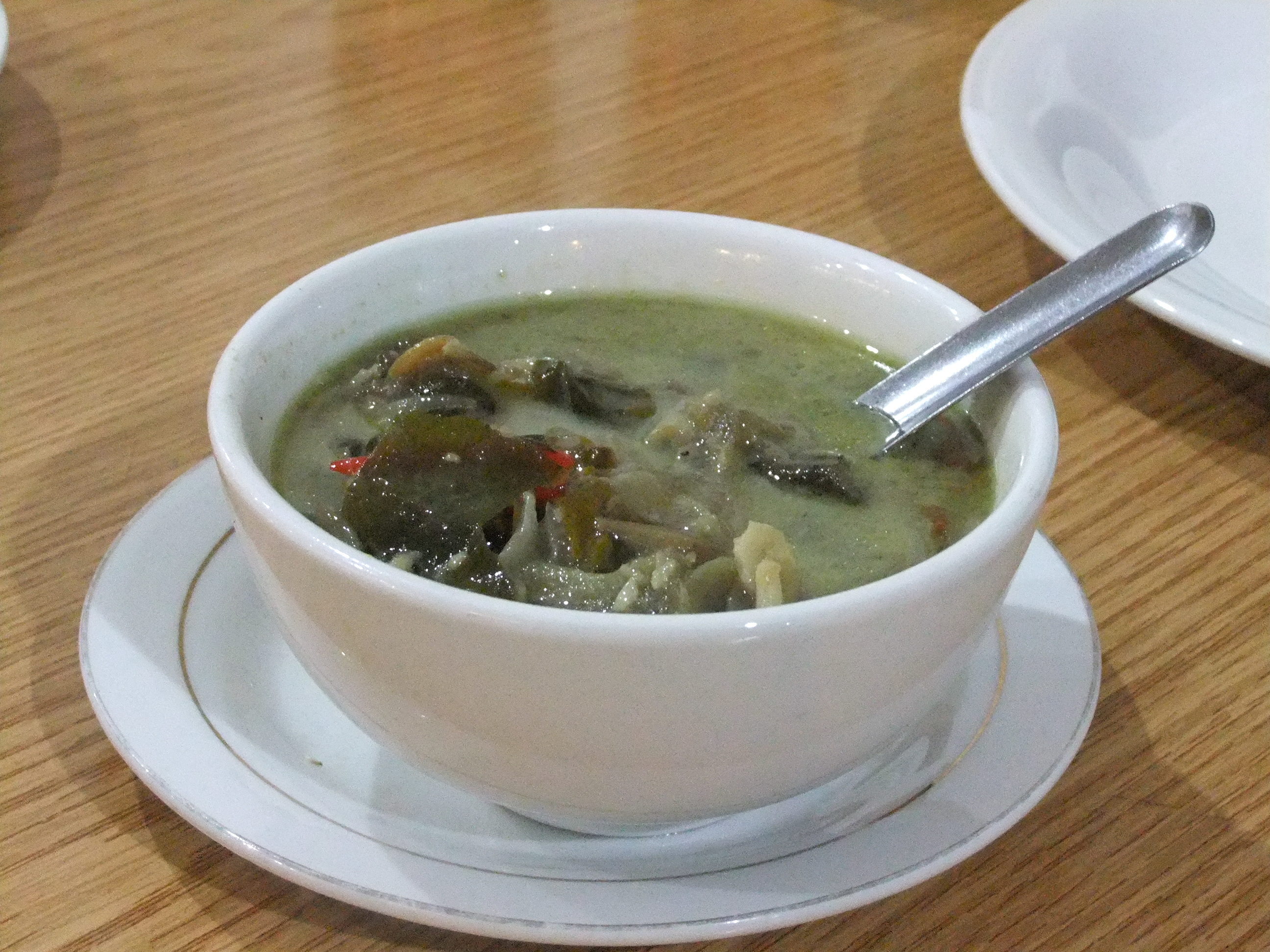
Sayur lodeh often have tempeh produced from advanced stages of fermentation mixed in for flavor.

Tempeh can also be differentiated according to its degrees of maturity (i.e. the mycelium's growth/age). Tempe mondhol is a tempeh that is not fully fermented, that is, the mycelium has not fully covered the surface. The taste of the beans is more solid and profound. Sometimes tempeh is left to ferment further, creating more pungent varieties: tempe wayu (day-old tempeh), i.e. when the tempeh starts to age; tempe semangit (a few-days old tempeh), i.e. when the tempeh becomes yellowish, a bit slimy, and the smell becomes more potent; and tempe bosok (lit. 'rotten tempeh'), when the mycelium has acquired a blackened coloration and the product has a putrid smell.

Some types of tempeh are made of ingredients that would be otherwise wasted if not used. According to traditional Javanese customs, wasting food is deemed as a sign of disrespect to Nature and other beings, and encourages efforts to use every part of an ingredient.

The wrappings used in tempeh making can contribute to its flavor and aroma. Though some prefer the traditional banana, waru or teak leaf, readily available plastic sheet wrappings have been increasingly widely used.

=== Tempe gembus ===
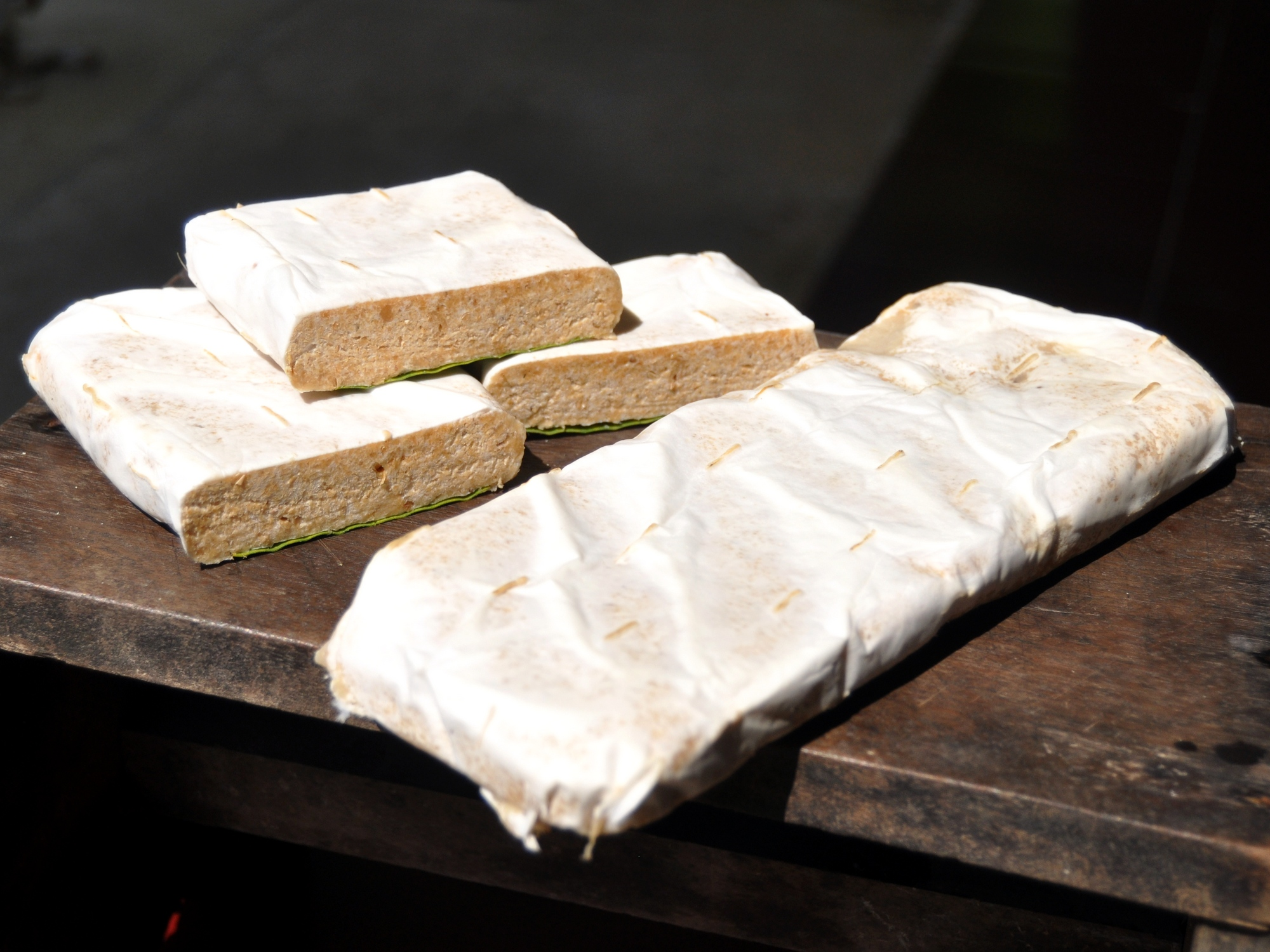
Tempe gembus

Tempe gembus is soft and fluffy tempeh made from soy pulp or tofu dregs. Tempe gembus usually can be found in traditional markets of Java, at a price lower than that of common soybean tempeh. It is made into a variety of dishes; for example it can be battered and/or fried, used in sayur lodeh, or tempe bacem. Tempe gembus is known by different names across Java; for example as tahu cokol or tahu susur in Temanggung.

=== Tempe semangit ===
In Indonesia, ripe tempeh (two or more days old) is considered a delicacy. Names include tempe semangit ('stinky tempeh') in Java, hampir busuk ('almost rotten') tempeh or tempe kemarin ('yesterday tempeh'). Having a slightly pungent aroma, small amounts are used as a flavoring agent in traditional Javanese sayur lodeh vegetable stew and sambal tumpang.

=== Tempe gódhóng ===
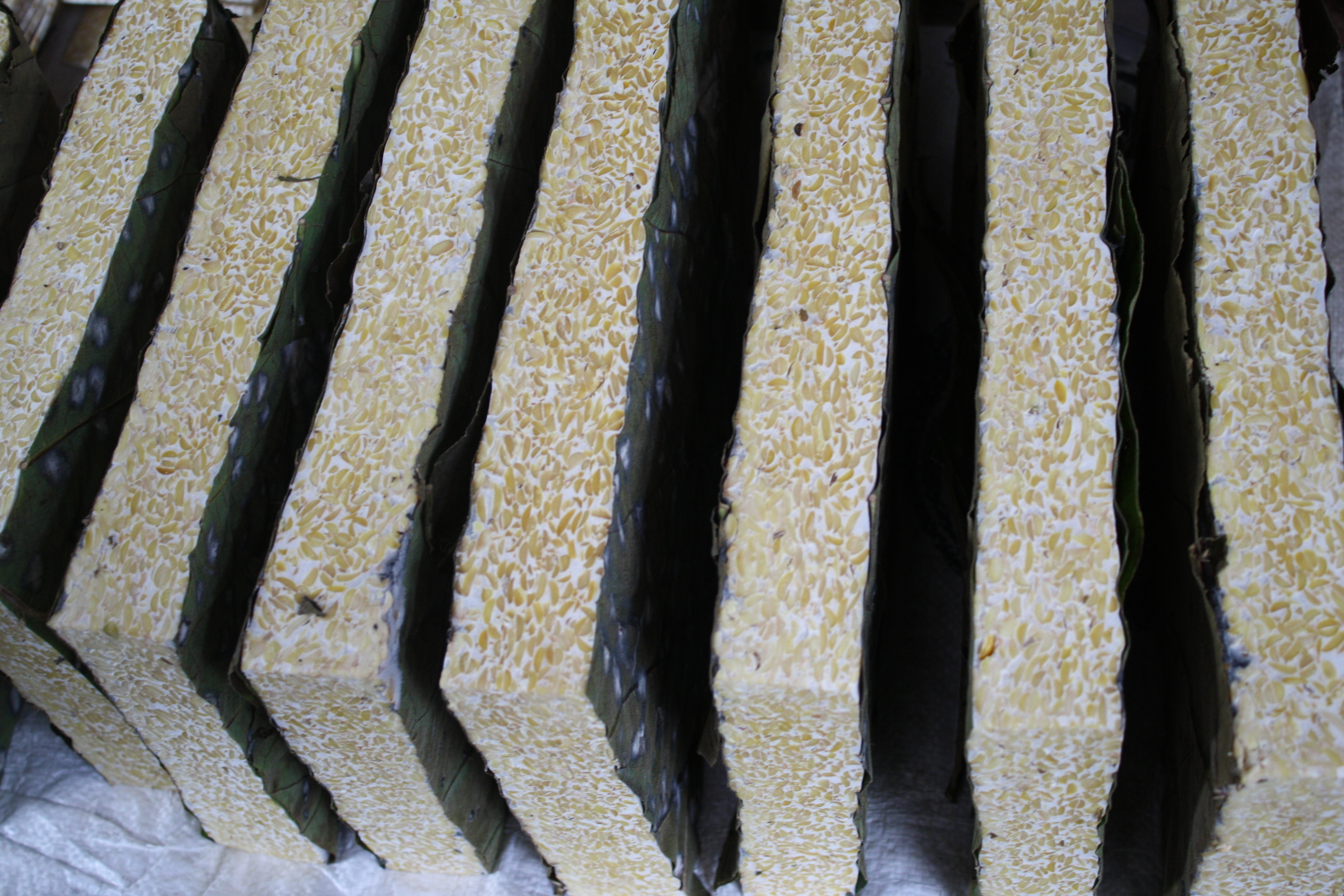
Tempe gódhóng jati (wrapped in teak leaf)

In Javanese, the term gódhóng means 'leaf'. Traditionally tempeh is wrapped in organic banana leaf, gódhóng waru (Hibiscus tiliaceus leaf) or gódhóng jati (teak leaf).

=== Tempe murni ===
Pure soybean cake, tempeh made in plastic wrap without any fillings or additives such as grated raw papaya. This was meant to create a more "hygienic and pure" tempeh free from any impurities or unwanted microbes.

=== Tempe menjes kacang ===
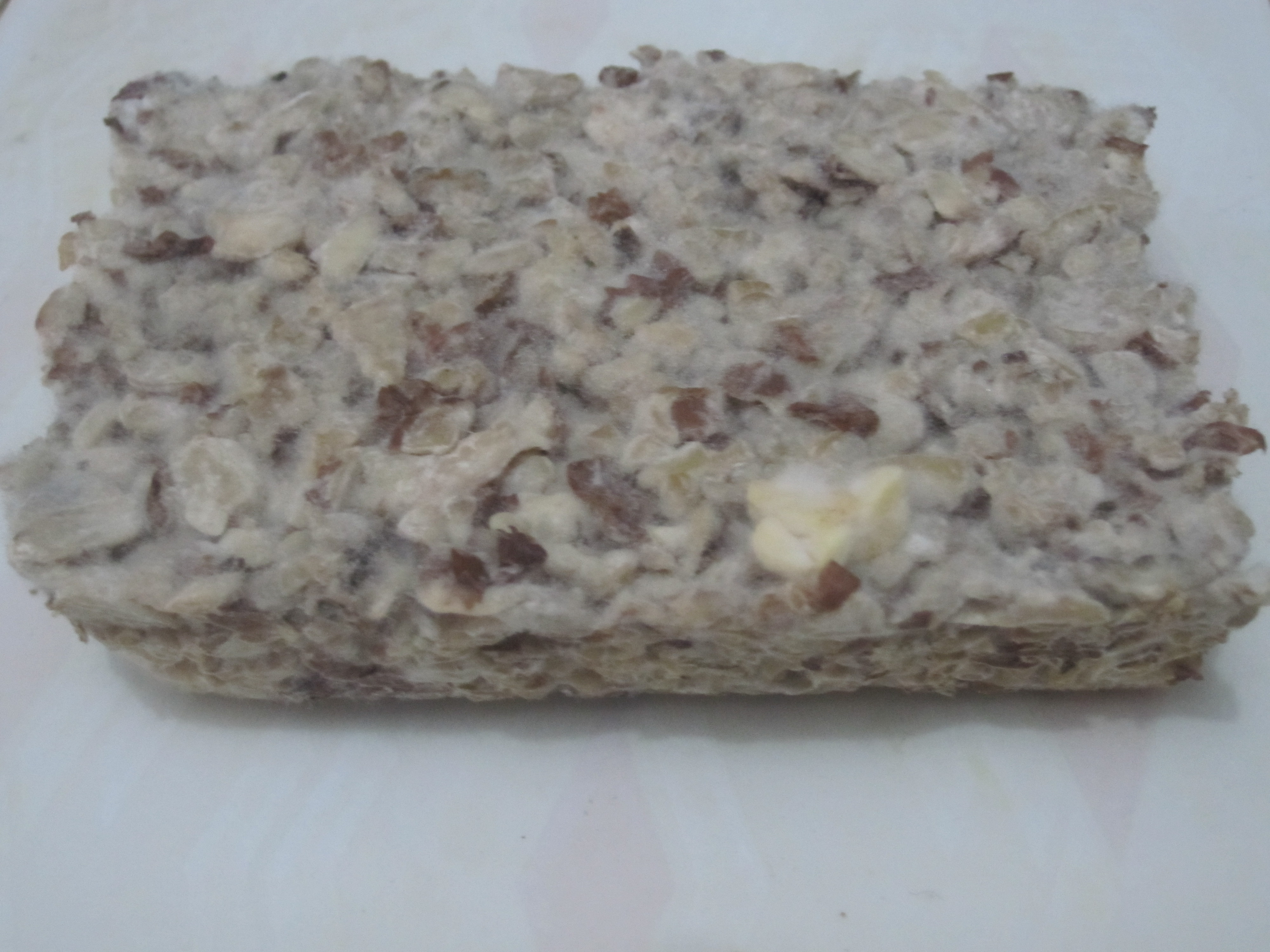
Menjes kacang

A specialty of Malang, the rough-textured tempeh menjes kacang is made from black soybeans mixed with other ingredients, such as peanut dregs, cassava fiber, and soybean meal. The process of making menjes kacang is quite similar to black oncom.

=== Tempe bongkrèk ===
Tempe bongkrèk is a variety of tempeh from Central Java, notably Banyumas. It is prepared with coconut dregs. This type of tempeh served as a main source of protein in Java due to its inexpensiveness and has led to several cases of fatal food poisoning, as it occasionally gets contaminated with the bacterium Burkholderia gladioli, and the unwanted organism produces toxins (bongkrek acid and toxoflavin) from the coconut, besides killing off the Rhizopus fungus due to the antibiotic activity of bongkrek acid.

Fatalities from contaminated tempe bongkrèk were once common in the area where it was produced. During 1930s, the Dutch East Indies government went through an economic depression, and this condition caused some of the people to make tempe bongkrek by themselves, instead of buying it directly from well-trained producers. As a result, the poisonings occurred frequently, reaching 10 to 12 a year. Dutch scientists W. K. Mertens and A. G. van Veen from the Eijkman Institute of Jakarta, started to find the cause of the poisoning in the early 1930s. The first outbreak of the bongkrek poisoning by tempe bongkrek was recorded by Dutch researchers; however, no further research to find the cause of the poisoning was conducted in 1895. They successfully identified the source of poisoning as a bacterium called Pseudomonas marginata. This bacterium, which is also named Burkholderia cocovenenans, caused the synthesis of a poisonous substance called bongkrek acid. B. cocovenenans is commonly found in plants and soil, which can be taken up by coconuts and corn, leading to the synthesis of bongkrek acid during the fermentation of such foods. Since 1975, consumption of contaminated tempe bongkrek has caused more than 3000 cases of bongkrek acid poisoning. In Indonesia, the overall reported mortality rate has turned out to be 60%. Due to the severity of the situation, the production of tempe bongkrek has been banned since 1988. Clandestine manufacture continues, however, due to the popular flavor. The problem of contamination is not encountered with bean and grain tempeh, which have a different composition of fatty acids that is not favorable for the growth of B. gladioli, but encourages growth of Rhizopus instead. When bean or grain tempeh has the proper color, texture and smell, it is a very strong indication the product is safe. Yellow tempe bongkrèk is always highly toxic due to toxoflavin, but tempe bongkrèk with a normal coloration may still contain lethal amounts of bongkrek acid.

=== Oat tempeh ===
A form of tempeh based on barley and oats instead of soy was developed by scientists at the Swedish Department of Food Science in 2008. It can be produced in climatic regions where it is not possible to grow soybeans.

== Cooking methods and recipes ==
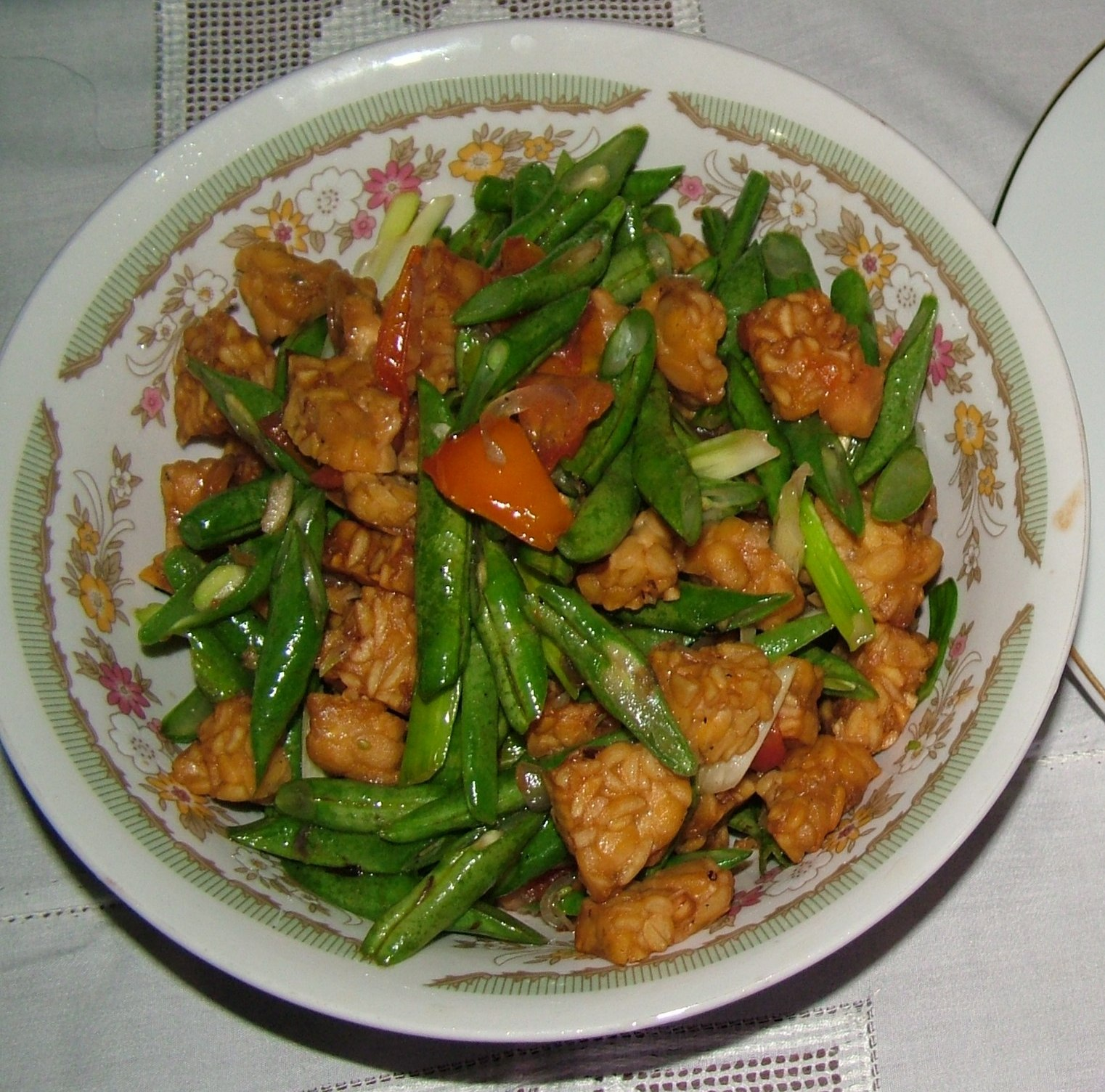
Sautéed tempeh with string green beans, a stir-fry Indonesian dish (osengan)

The simplest way to cook tempeh is by frying. It is both deep-fried and stir-fried. However, there are several cooking methods and recipe variations. Among others are:

=== Tempe goreng ===
Perhaps the simplest and most popular way to prepare tempeh in Indonesia. The tempeh is sliced and seasoned in a mixture of ground garlic, coriander seeds and salt, and then deep fried in palm oil. The tempeh might be coated in batter prior to frying, or directly fried without any batter. Fried unbattered tempeh has a golden-brown color when done.

=== Tempe bacem ===
Tempe bacem is a traditional Javanese dish originating in Central Java. Bacem is a Javanese cooking method of braising in spices and palm sugar and boiling the food in a closed place until the water runs out. The tempeh is first braised in a mixture of coconut water, palm sugar, and spices including coriander seeds, shallots, galangal, and bay leaves, and then briefly deep-fried. The result is a moist, sweet and spicy, dark-colored tempeh. Tofu may also be used, yielding tahu bacem.

=== Tempe mendoan ===
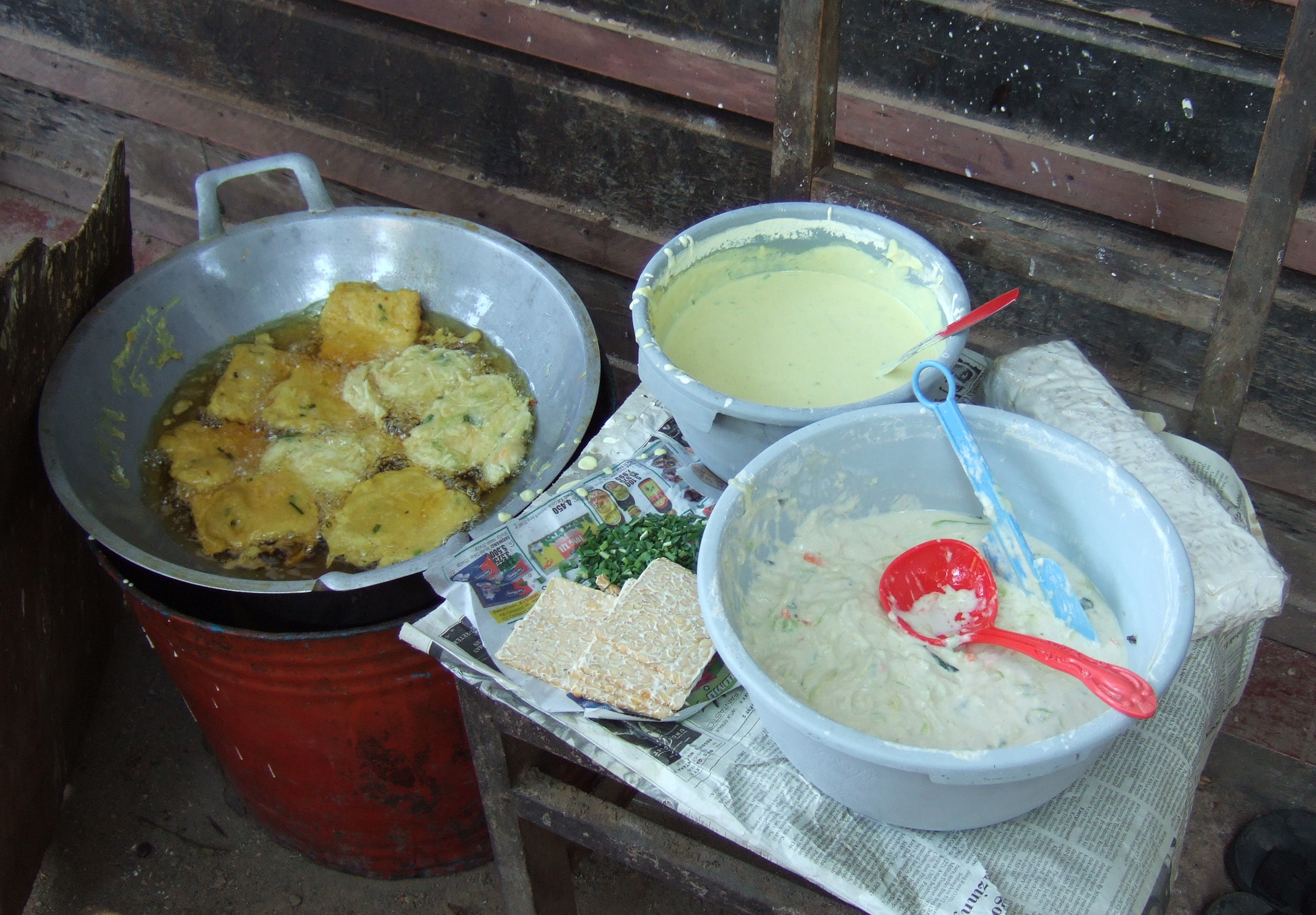
Frying tempe mendoan

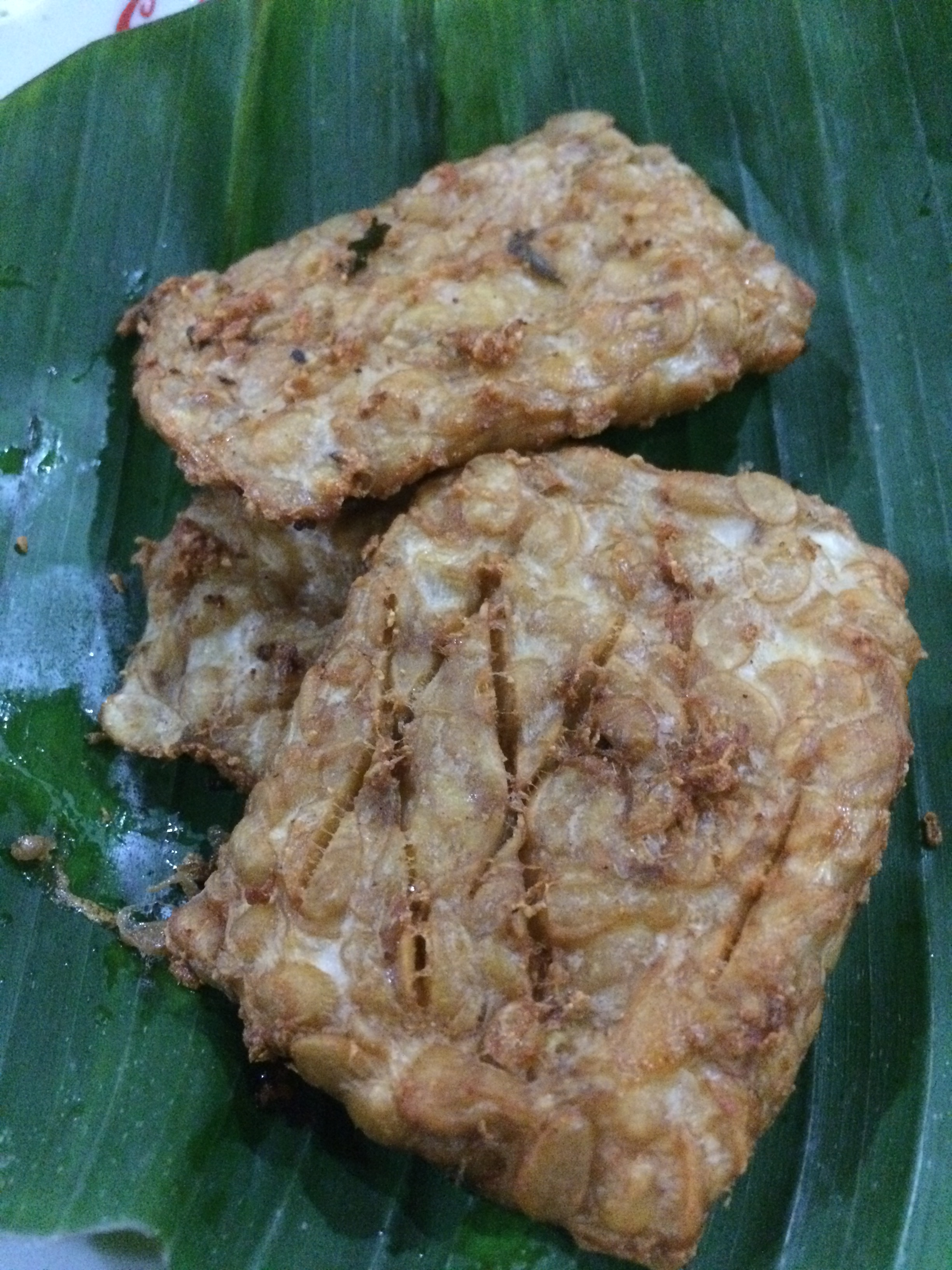
Cooked tempe garit/goreng (fried)

This variation is often found in Purwokerto. The word mendoan originates in the Banyumas regional dialect, and means 'flash-fried'. The tempeh is first dipped in spiced flour before quickly frying in very hot oil, resulting in a product that is cooked on the outside, but raw or only partially so on the inside. It has a limp, soft texture compared to the more common, crisp, fully fried tempeh.

=== Tempe kering ===
Also known as kering tempe (lit: 'dry tempeh'), or sambal goreng tempe if mixed with plenty of hot and spicy sambal chili pepper sauce. It is a crispy, sweet and spicy, fried tempeh. The raw tempeh is cut into small sticks and thoroughly deep-fried until no longer moist, and then mixed with palm sugar, chili pepper or other spices, or with sweet soy sauce. Often it is mixed with separately fried peanuts and anchovies (ikan teri). This dry tempeh will keep for up to a month if cooked and stored properly.

=== Tempe orek or orak-arik tempe ===
This variation is almost identical to tempe kering, but is more soft and moist. The sweet taste is due to generous addition of kecap manis (sweet soy sauce).

=== Tumis tempe or oseng tempe ===
Stir-fried tempeh with vegetables such as green bean, basil, or onion, with spices. Other recipes might add coconut milk for a milky-colored, and rather moist, stir-fried tempeh.

=== Tempe penyet ===
Fried tempeh mixed with sambal chili paste in a mortar and pestle. Usually served in addition to other penyet dishes, such as ayam penyet (chicken) or iga penyet (ribs).

=== Tempe satay ===
Tempeh skewered and grilled as satay.

Sate kere (Javanese for 'poor man's satay') from Solo in Central Java is made from fluffy tempe gembus. Ground tempeh can also be made into a thick sauce, such as in sate ambal, a chicken satay from Kebumen, Central Java, where tempeh flavored with chili and spices replaces the more common peanut sauce.

=== Kripik tempe ===
Kripik tempe snack crackers; a thinly sliced tempeh, battered and deep fried until crispy. It is popular across Java, but notably produced in Bandung, West Java, and Malang, East Java.

=== Tempeh sandwich or tempeh burger ===
Fried, grilled or otherwise cooked tempeh patties, sandwiched between slices of bread or hamburger buns with salad, sauces or seasonings.

Tempeh dishes

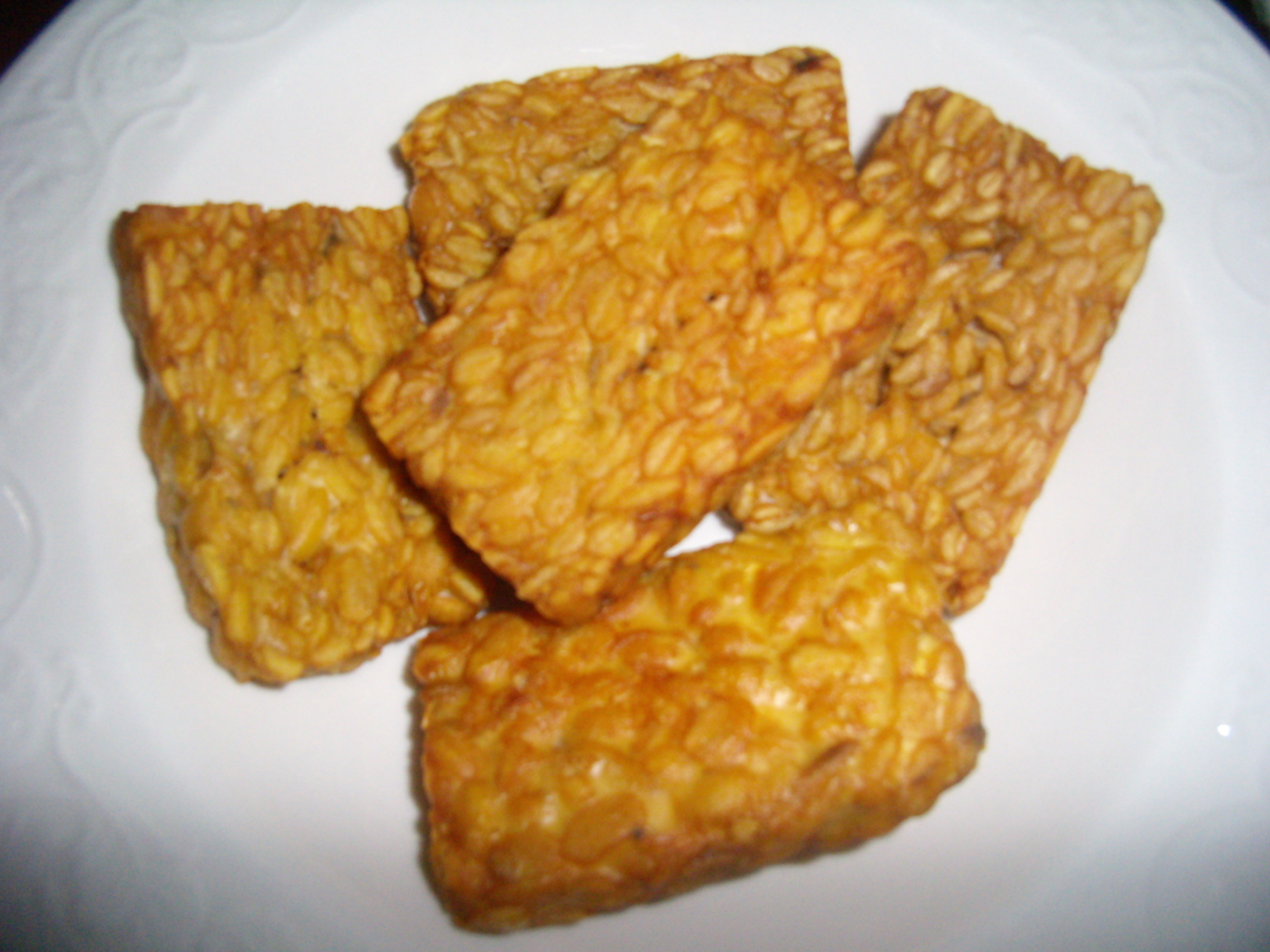
The common tempeh goreng (un-battered) in Indonesia

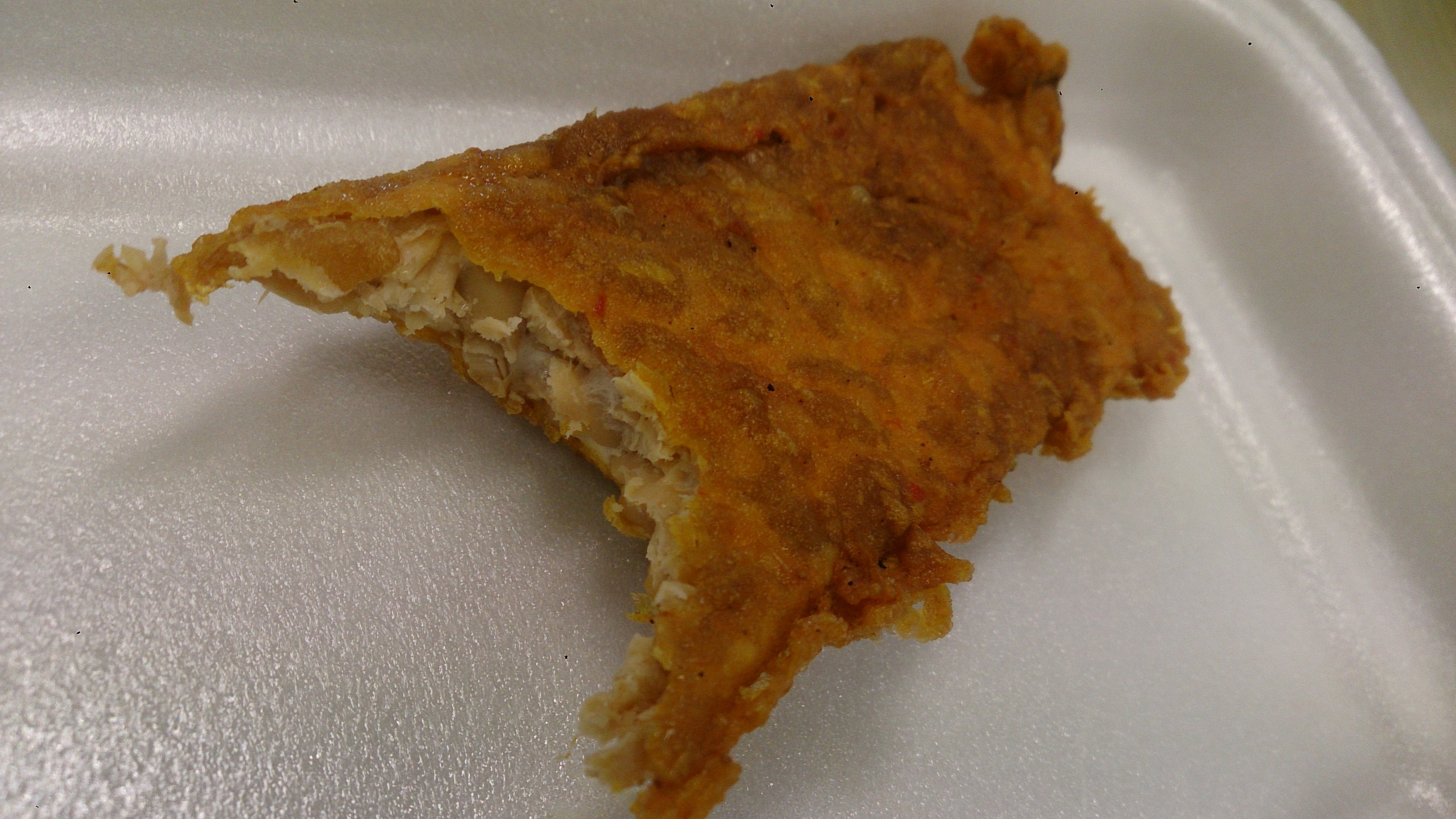
Fried tempeh (battered) sold at a food court in Singapore

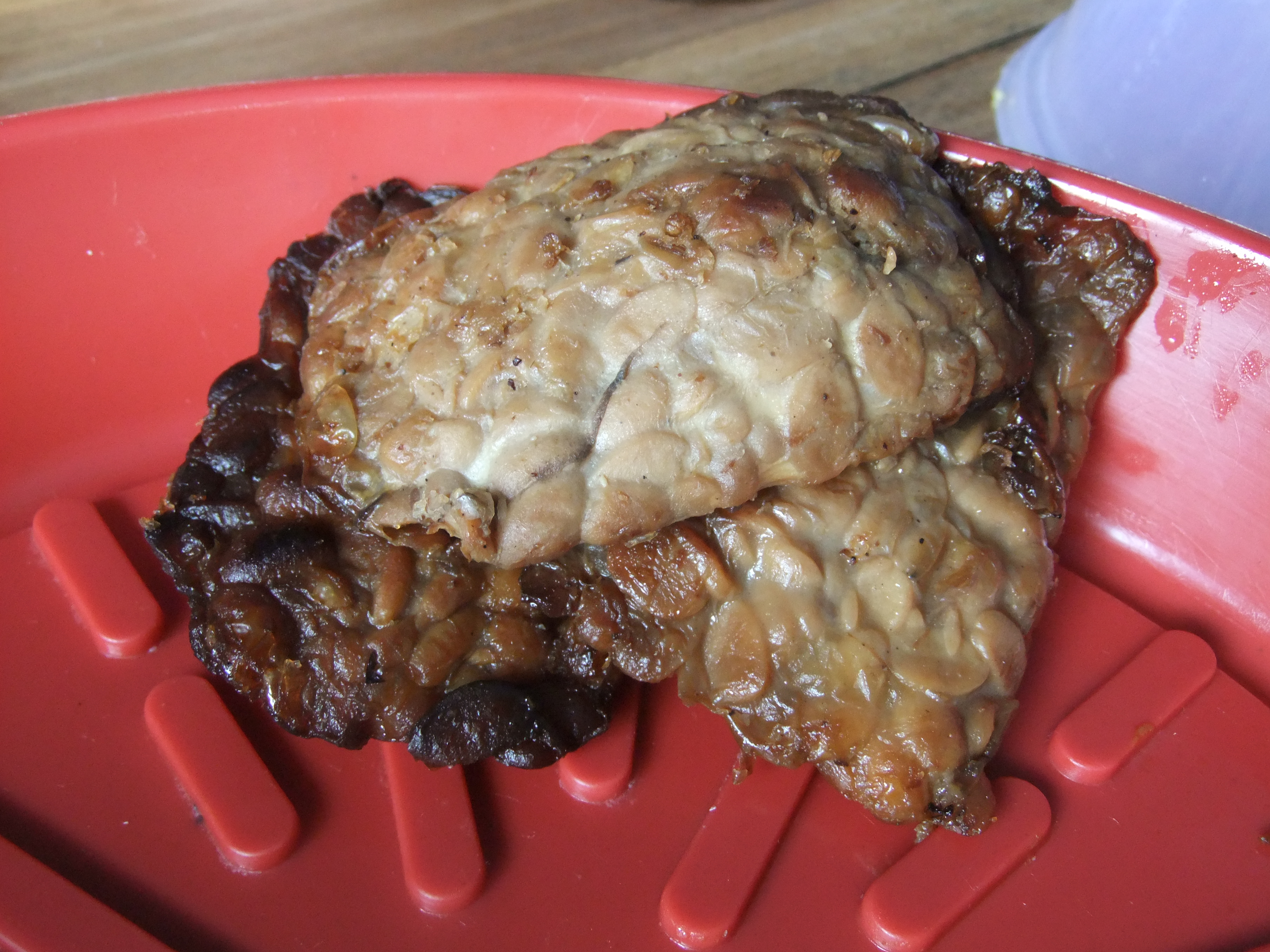
Tempe bacem

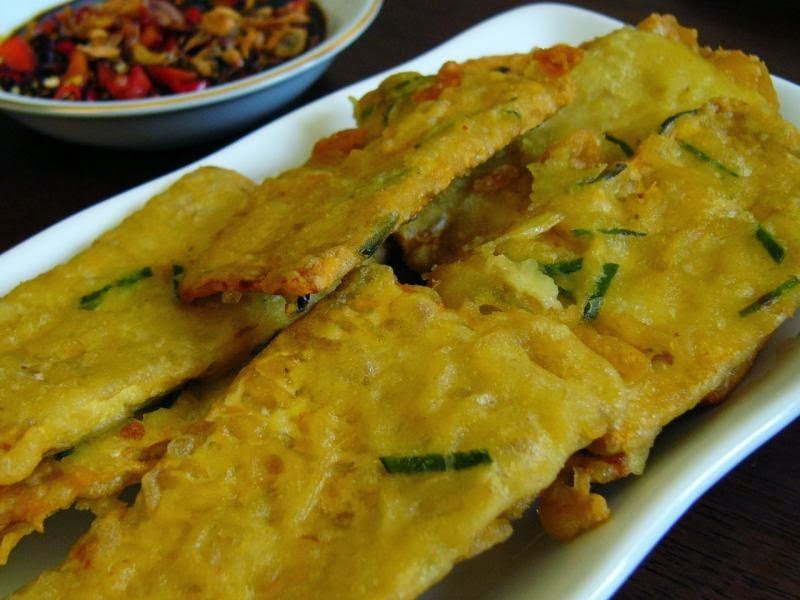
Tempe mendoan

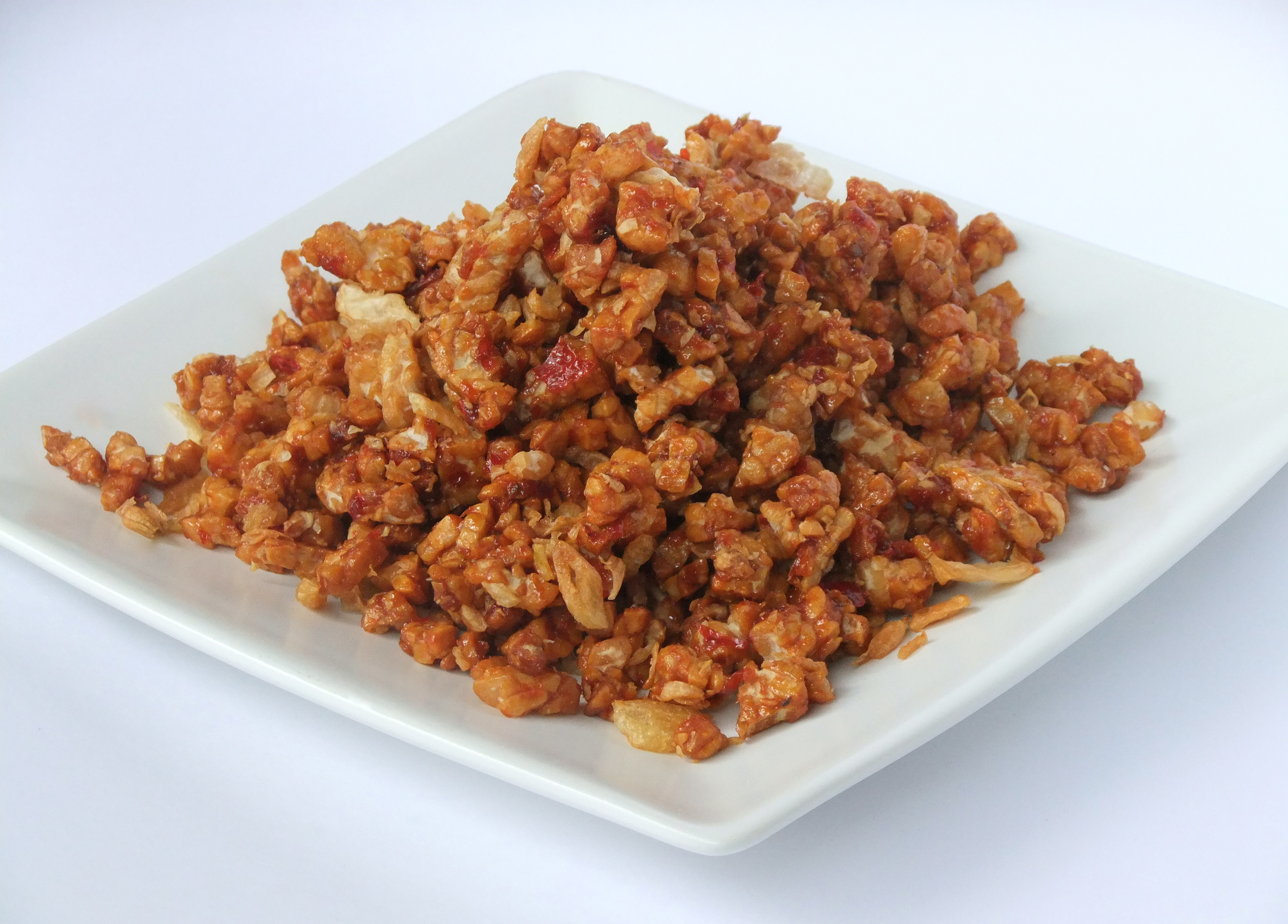
Kering tempe or sambal goreng tempe

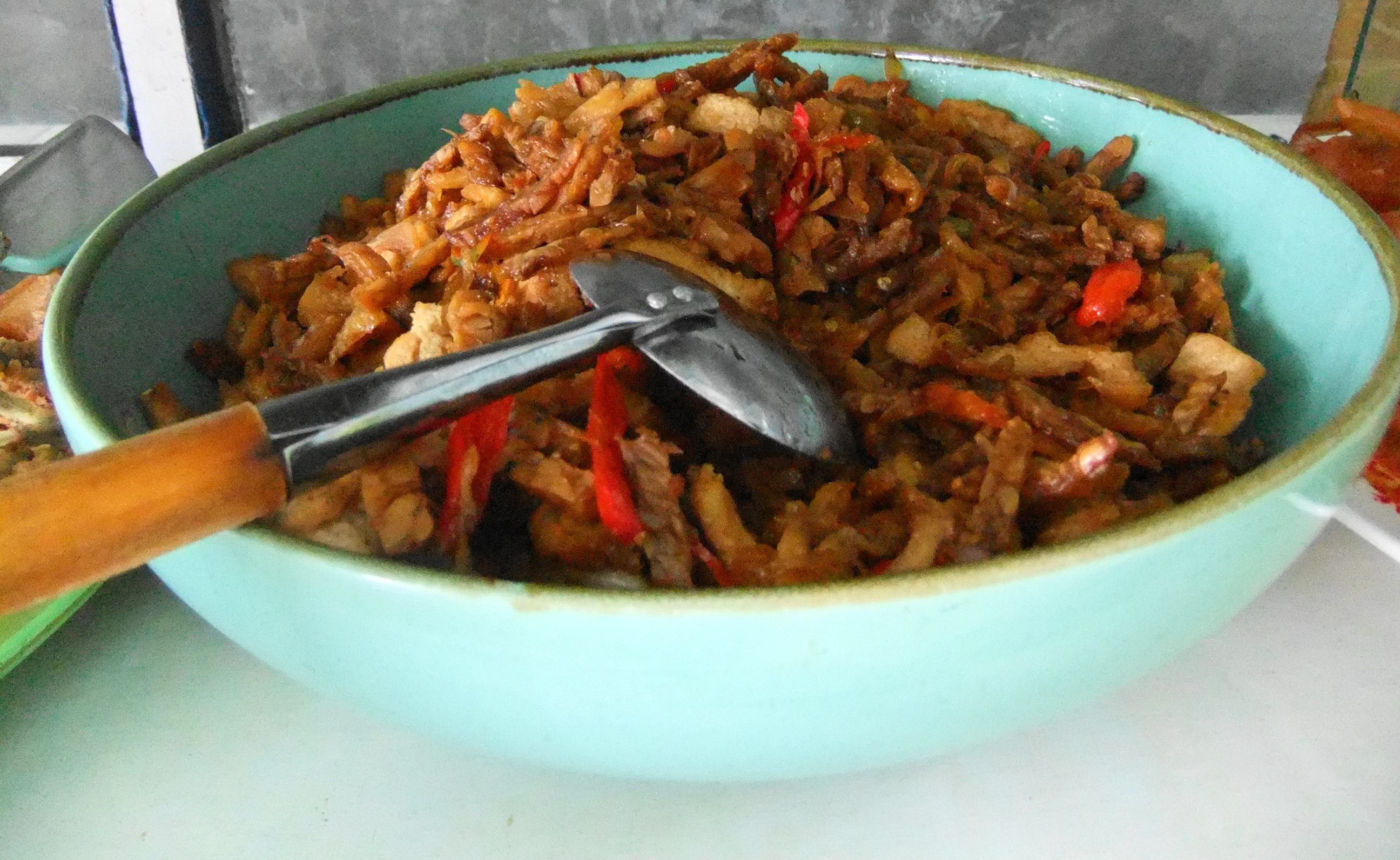
Tempe orek or orak-arik tempe

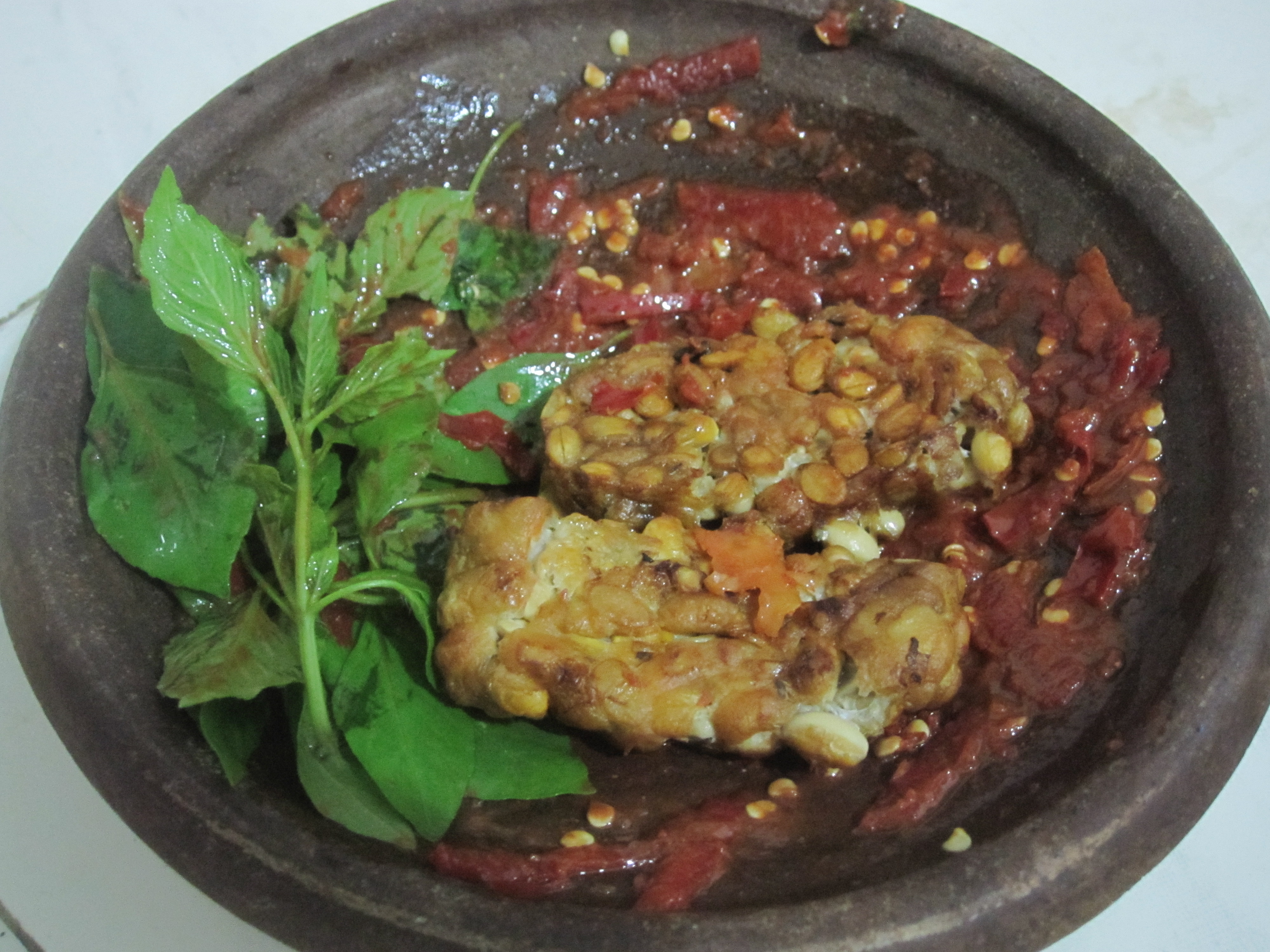
Tempe penyet

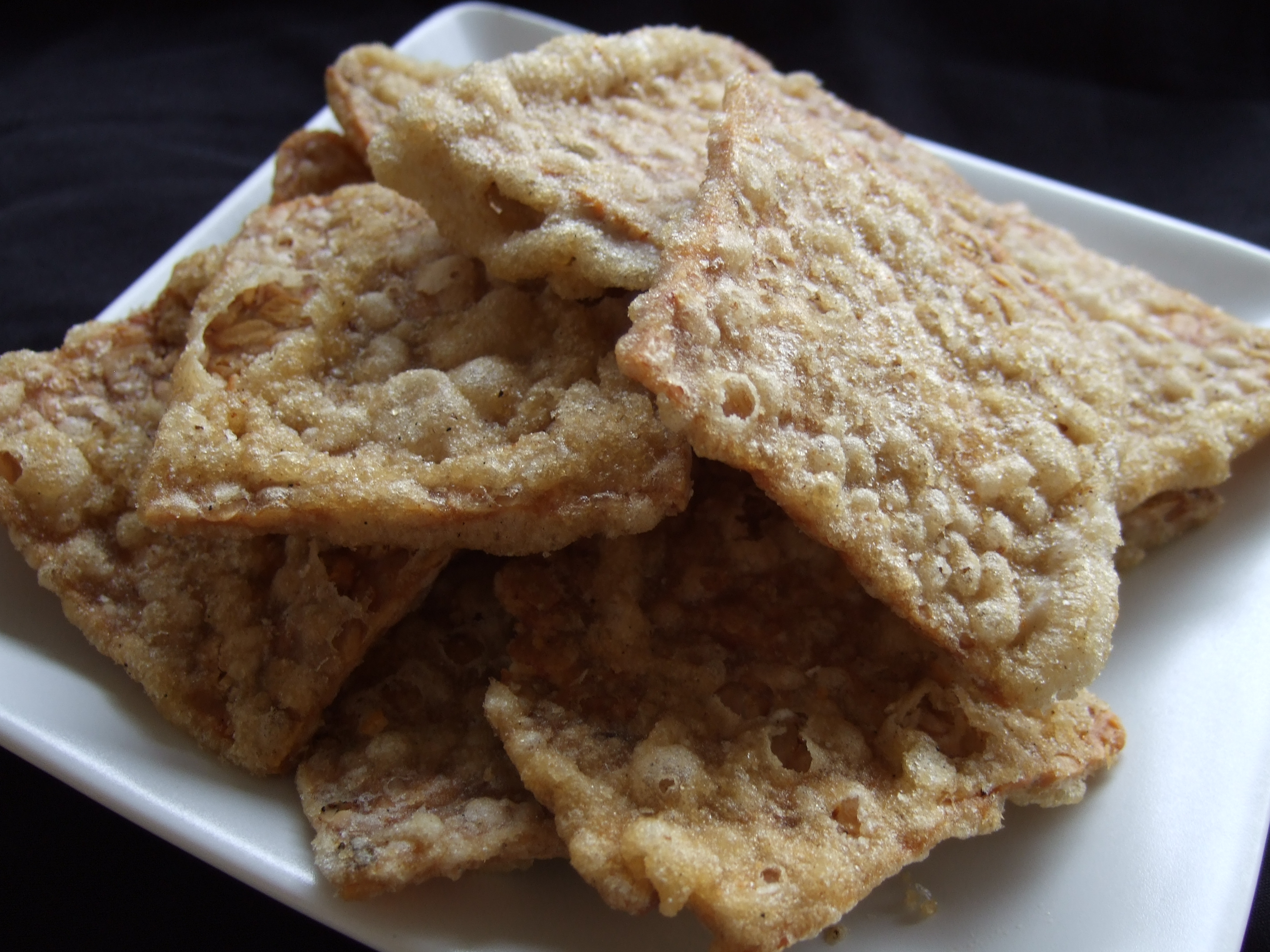
Crispy kripik tempeh as a snack

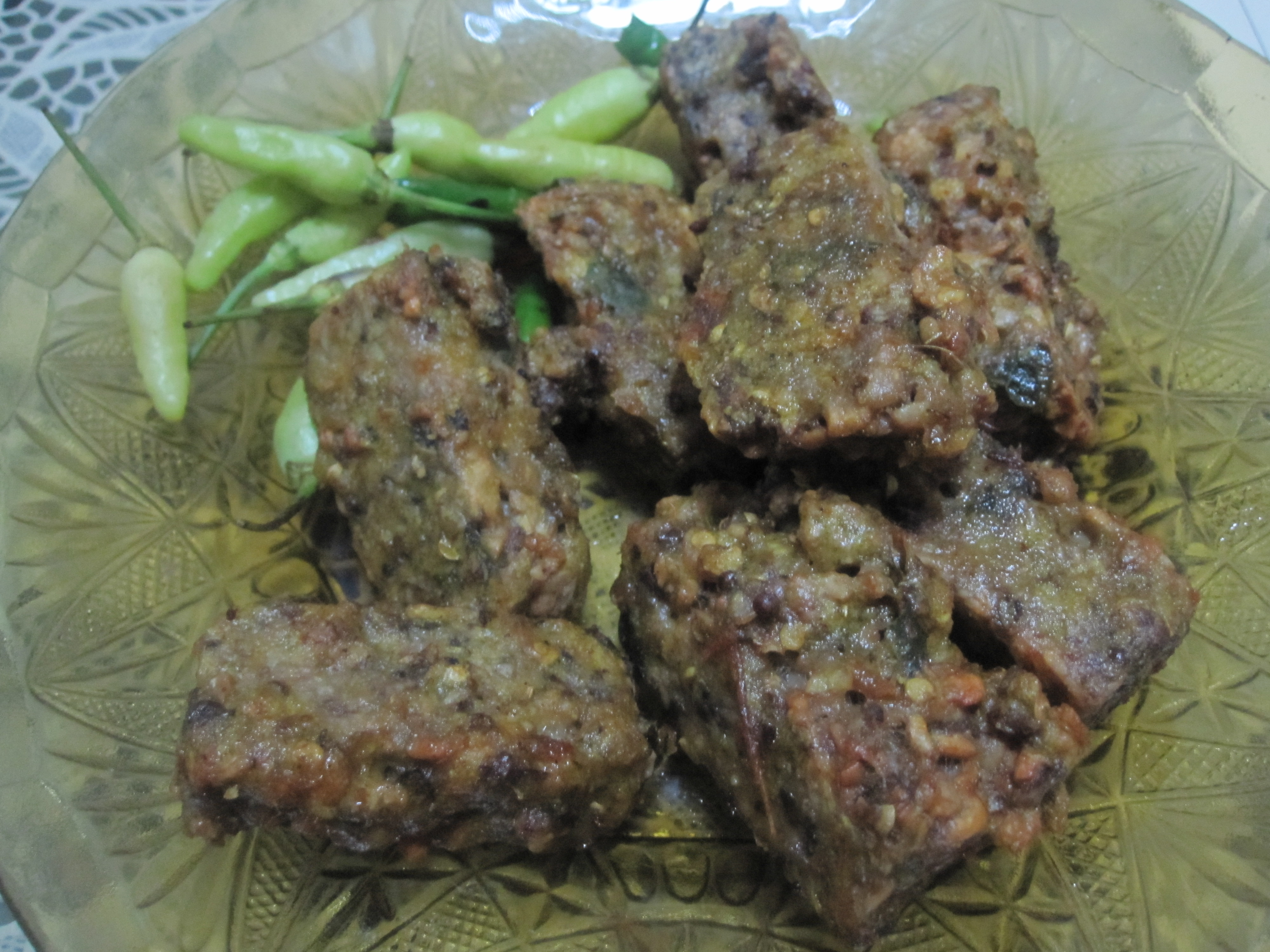
Fried menjes kacang

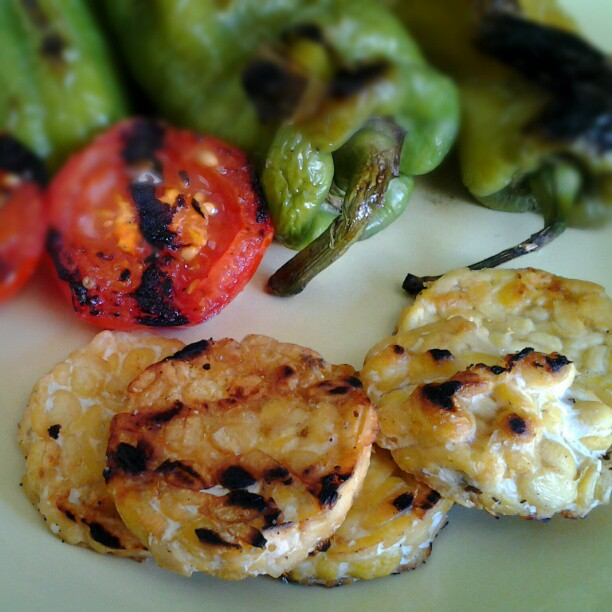
Grilled tempeh

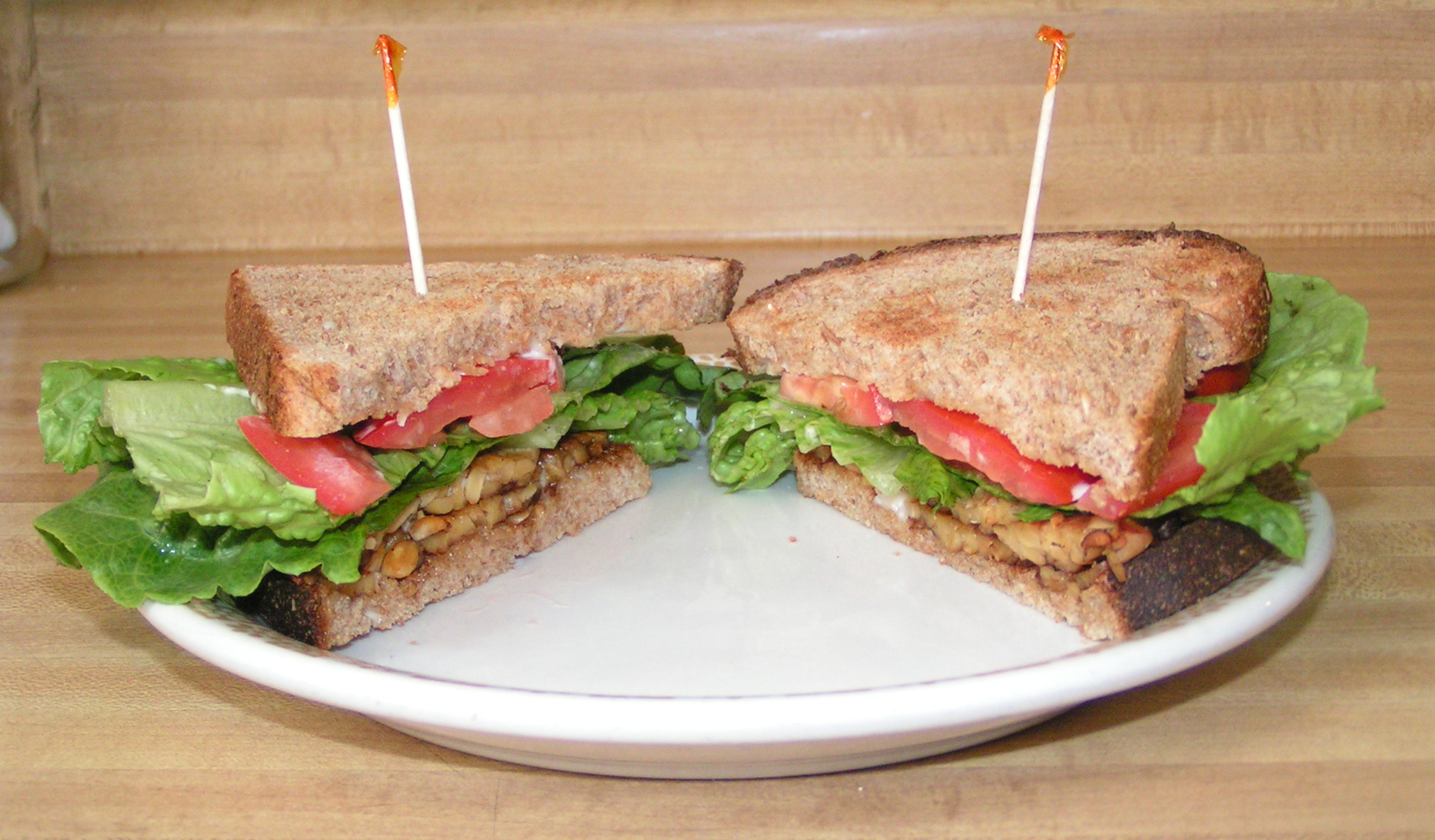
Tempeh sandwich

== Preservation ==
Freshly made, raw tempeh remains edible for a few days at room temperature. It is neither acidic nor does it contain significant amounts of alcohol. It, however, shows greater resistance to spoilage processes such as lipid peroxidation than unfermented soybeans due to its antioxidant contents.

Cooking methods such as tempe kering, the deep-fried and seasoned bits of tempeh allows Tempeh to last for a month or more and still be good to consume, if cooked correctly and stored properly in an air-tight jar. The deep-frying process removes the moisture, preventing further fermentation and deterioration, thus prolonging its shelf life.

=== Antimicrobial agents ===
Rhizopus cultures responsible for the fermentation of tempeh from soybean produce natural, heat-stable antimicrobial agents against spoilage and disease-causing microorganisms, extending the shelf life of the fermented product through microbial antagonism. The mold is capable of inhibiting the growth of other fungi such as Aspergillus flavus and Aspergillus parasiticus by interfering with the accumulation of aflatoxin (especially aflatoxin B1), the mycotoxin of greatest concern. R. oligosporus has also been reported to produce four to five antibacterial substances during fermentation process. It produces phenolic compounds against pathogenic bacteria such as Helicobacter pylori and an antibacterial protein has been identified with activities against Bacillus species (especially against Bacillus subtilis and Bacillus cereus), Staphylococcus aureus, and Streptococcus cremoris.

=== Non-refrigerated fresh tempeh ===
Tempeh can be sold and consumed fresh within 48 hours once removed from its incubator. It is commonly transported to the market in its incubation container (e.g. polyethylene bag, banana leaf wrapper, etc.) and placed in the shade. In areas with warmer climates, tempeh can be kept at room temperature for one to three days before it becomes overripe. In locations with more temperate temperatures, it can keep for one to four days but will usually need to be refrigerated to prevent spoilage.

=== Storage methods ===
Fresh refrigerated tempeh should be sealed in a labeled polyethylene bag and kept in temperatures below 4 °C (40 °F). It can be kept at this temperature for three to five days and sometimes, even as long as a week. Storage life could be extended to two or three weeks if the tempeh is blanched or steamed prior to refrigeration due to the inactivation of enzymes and destruction of bacteria.

Freezing is the preferred way to preserve tempeh due to its capability for wide distribution. Tempeh can be frozen whole or in slices, depending on preference. During the freezing process, whole tempeh is placed in its perforated wrapper whereas sliced tempeh is packaged in a labelled polyethylene bag prior to being sealed in an outer bag and then frozen immediately. This method will keep for months with only a small loss of texture and flavor.

Blanching tempeh by steaming or parboiling helps to extend the storage life by preventing bacterial growth, stopping mold growth and inactivating enzymes. Steaming appears to have a less negative effect than parboiling in terms of texture, flavor and nutritional value. Blanching is a great method for preserving tempeh prior to refrigeration, though not as beneficial for tempeh that is to be frozen.

=== Dehydration ===
==== Air tray drying ====
Tempeh can be dried via the air tray drying method. Cubes of tempeh placed on steel, mesh bottom trays are dried by the circulating hot air dryer. After the product is finished, they can be cut into 2.5-centimetre (1-inch) squares at 90 °C (200 °F) for 90 to 120 minutes in order to reduce moisture content to 2–4%. When placed in moisture proof Pliofilm bags, the tempeh has a shelf life of several months at room temperature. Although this is a convenient method that produces a shelf stable product without requirement of refrigeration, the process of hot air drying can cause a significant loss of nutritional content such as the soluble solids and nitrogen protein content.

==== Sun drying ====
This preservation method is most economical out of all methods. The tempeh can be blanched prior to dehydration to preserve flavor and prolong shelf life. Tempeh is exposed to internal solar dryer temperature of 80–90 °C (180–200 °F) in this method. A disadvantage of this method is that sunlight can destroy some of the vitamin B_{12} of tempeh.

==== Freeze-drying ====
This method is the most expensive out of all dehydration methods but provides the advantage of long stable shelf life at room temperature and an excellent retention of soluble nutrients (nitrogen protein and other solids). The product undergoes quick freeze at 10 °C (50 °F) and is then dried at a moderate temperature inside a strong vacuum. Due to the expensive nature of the equipment, the final product price is higher than tempeh preserved through other methods.

==== Spray-drying ====
As this method is traditionally used for small particles, it is used to produce tempeh powder for products such as soups, breads, tortillas, etc. However, this method can be expensive due to the bulky nature of the equipment.

==== Deep-frying ====
This method produces ready to eat tempeh products. A culinary oil with a high smoke point, such as rapeseed, soy, safflower, peanut, or coconut oil, is heated to 180 °C (350 °F) in the deep fryer. The tempeh is deep-fried until golden brown and crisp, and then cooled quickly in a sterile environment to be sealed in Pliofilm bags and stored in a cool, dry place. The shelf life of this product lasts around a week but can be extended if the tempeh is sun dried or oven dried prior to deep frying.

== See also ==
- List of fermented soy products
- List of meat substitutes
- List of soy-based foods
- Miso
- Nattō
- Oncom
- Tapai
- Veganism
