= Chameleon (disambiguation) =

A chameleon is an Old World lizard belonging to the family Chamaeleonidae.

Chameleon (or variants such as chamaeleon and cameleon) may also refer to:

== Literature ==
=== Comics ===
- Chameleon (character), a Marvel Comics supervillain
- Chameleon (manga), a 1990 Japanese manga series
- Reep Daggle or Chameleon, a DC Comics superhero

=== Other uses in literature ===
- Chameleon (novel), a financial thriller novel by Richard Hains
- Chameleon, a character from the 1977 Piers Anthony novel A Spell for Chameleon
- "The Chameleon" (short story), 1884, by Anton Chekhov
- The Chameleon (magazine), 1894

== Computing ==
- Chameleon, a suite of TCP/IP client applications from NetManage
- Chameleon (computing), a computer workstation
- Chameleon botnet

== Film ==
=== Characters ===
- The Chameleon, main antagonist of Kung Fu Panda 4

=== Shows ===
- Cameleon (film), a 1997 British film
- Chameleon (1995 film), American film
- Chameleon (1998 film), American TV film
- Chameleon (2008 Hungarian film)
- Chameleon (2008 Japanese film)
- Chameleon (2016 film), Chilean film
- The Chameleon (1920 film), a silent comedy film
- The Chameleon (2010 film), directed by Jean-Paul Salomé
- The Chameleon, a 1989 adult film by John Leslie

== Television ==
=== Characters ===
- Chameleon (Battlestar Galactica), a character from Battlestar Galactica
- The Chameleon, the antagonist of "Scooby's Gold Medal Gambit", episode 6 of The New Scooby and Scrappy-Doo Show (1983)
- The Chameleon, a character from T.U.F.F. Puppy
- The Chameleon, a Kaiju clone character from Godzilla: The Series
- The Chameleons, characters in the Doctor Who serial The Faceless Ones

=== Episodes ===
- "Chameleon", Code Name: Eternity episode 24 (2000)
- "Chameleon", Colourblocks series 1, episode 8 (2022)
- "Chameleon", Criminal Minds season 14, episode 13 (2019)
- "Chameleon", Grami's Circus Show season 1, episode 7a (2014)
- "Chameleon", Law & Order: Special Victims Unit season 4, episode 1 (2002)
- "Chameleon", Miraculous: Tales of Ladybug & Cat Noir season 3, episode 3 (2019)
- "Chameleon", Super Secret Secret Squirrel episode 7 (1993)
- "Chameleon", Teletubbies season 3, episode 56 (1999)
- "Chameleon" The Twilight Zone (1985) season 1, episode 3c (1985)
- "Chameleon", Without a Trace season 7, episode 15 (2009)
- "Chameleon", Xiaolin Showdown season 1, episode 6 (2003)
- "Chameleon", Young Blades episode 12 (2005)
- "Chameleons", Kidd Video season 1, episode 9 (1985)
- "The Chameleon", Beastmaster season 1, episode 15 (2000)
- "The Chameleon", Birdman and the Galaxy Trio episode 10a (1967)
- "The Chameleon", Dragon Flyz episode 24 (1997)
- "The Chameleon", Katts and Dog season 2, episode 14 (1990)
- "The Chameleon", James Bond Jr. episode 3 (1991)
- "The Chameleon", My Three Sons season 8, episode 8 (1967)
- "The Chameleon", P.S. I Luv U episode 13 (1992)
- "The Chameleon", Super President episode 25 (1967)
- "The Chameleon", The Fall Guy season 2, episode 21 (1983)
- "The Chameleon", The F.B.I. season 1, episode 17 (1967)
- "The Chameleon", The New Adventures of Batman episode 8 (1977)
- "The Chameleon", The Outer Limits season 1, episode 31 (1964)

== Games ==
- Chameleon (2005 video game), a stealth-action video game
- The Chameleon (party game), a 2017 deception game
- Chameleon (Dungeons & Dragons), a prestige class in Dungeons & Dragons
- Chameleon (G.I. Joe), a fictional character in the G.I. Joe universe
- Chameleon (Mortal Kombat), a character in the Mortal Kombat video game series
- Chameleon: To Dye For!, a 2008 video game by Starfish SD
- Chameleon (video game console), a cancelled game console

== Music ==
=== Artists ===
- Chameleon (American band), a 1970s American band
- Chameleon (British band), a British vocal group founded in 1989 by Nigel Hess
- Jose Chameleone (born 1979), Ugandan musician
- The Chameleons, a UK post-punk band

=== Albums ===
- Caméléon (album), 2012, by Shy'm
- Chameleon (EP), 2017, by Grey
- Chameleon (Margaret Berger album)
- Chameleon (Maynard Ferguson album), 1974
- Chameleon (The Four Seasons album), 1972
- Chameleon (Helloween album), 1993
- Chameleon (Labelle album)
- Chameleon (Måns Zelmerlöw album)
- Chameleon, a 1980 album by Tiny Tim

=== Songs ===
- "Caméléon" (song), by Maître Gims
- "Chameleon" (Ira Losco song), 2015
- "Chameleon" (King Gnu song), 2022
- "Chameleon" (Michela Pace song), a 2019 song that represented Malta in the Eurovision Song Contest
- "Chameleon" (Pnau song), 2016
- "Chameleon" (composition), a 1973 song by Herbie Hancock from Head Hunters
- "Chameleon", a 1970 song by Creedence Clearwater Revival from Pendulum
- "Chameleon", a video-single by Metis (American musician)
- "Chameleon", a 1976 song by Elton John from Blue Moves
- "Chaneleon", a 2000 song by Self from Gizmodgery
- "Chaneleon", a 2008 song by Brendan Canning from Something for All of Us...
- "Chameleon", a 2015 song by Hardwell and Wiwek

=== Other uses in music ===
- The Chameleon Club, a music venue in Lancaster, Pennsylvania
- Chameleon (label)

== Science ==
- Cameleon (protein), an artificial protein
- Chamaeleon, a constellation
- Chamaeleon (plant), a genus of plants
- Chameleon particle, a hypothetical elementary particle
- American chameleon or Carolina anole (Anolis carolinensis), a species of arboreal lizard

== Other uses ==
- Chamaeleon (philosopher) (c. 350 – c. 275 BC), ancient Greek philosopher
- SMS Camäleon, a Prussian (later German) gunboat built in the 1860s
- SMS Camaeleon, a German armored gunboat built in the late 1870s and early 1880s

== See also ==
- K-Meleon, a web browser
- Kamelion, a fictional character in Doctor Who
- Khameleon, a character in the Mortal Kombat video game series
