= Adenine nucleotide translocator =

Class of transport proteins

ADP/ATP translocases
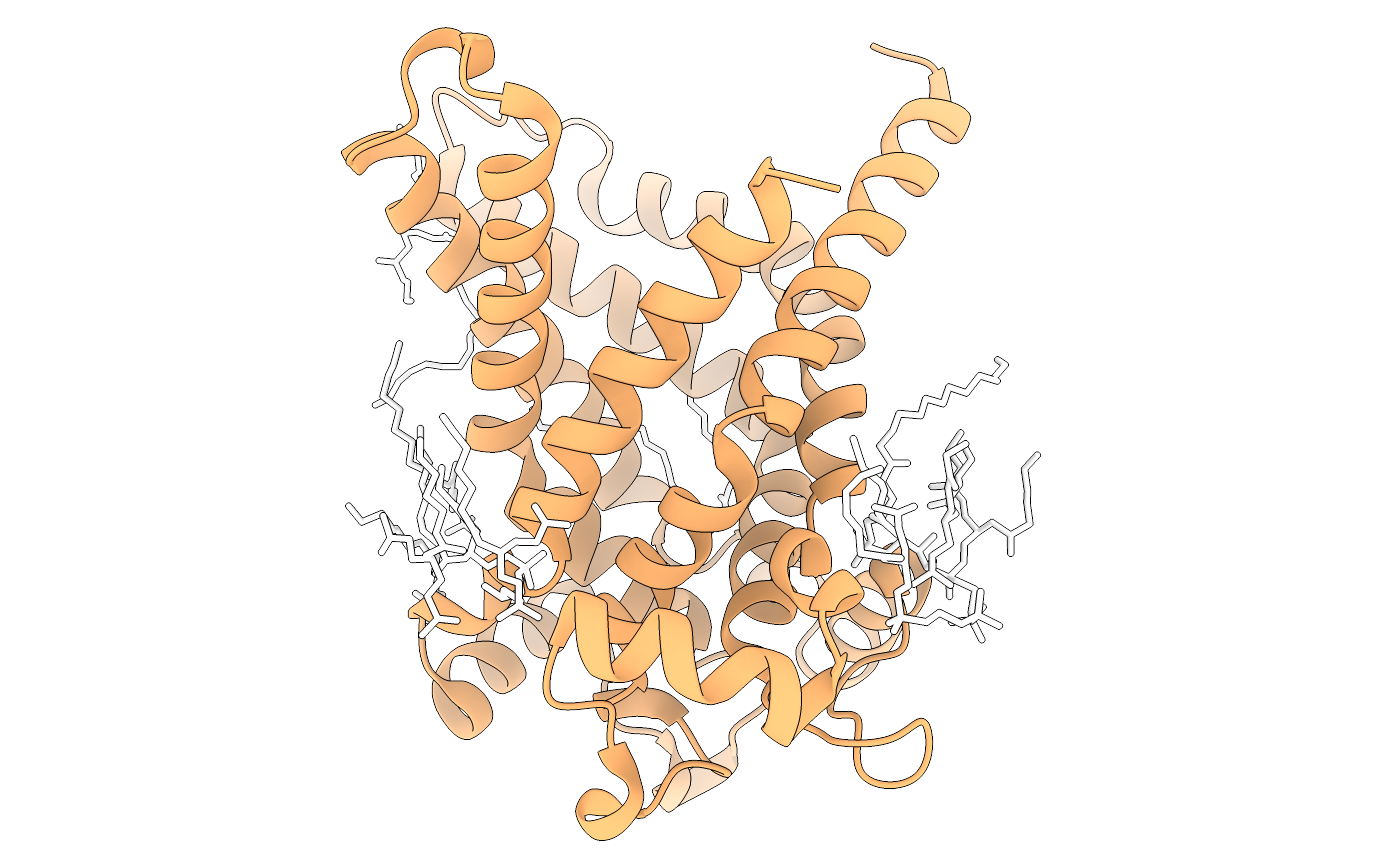
- Side view of the ATP–ADP translocase 1, PDB: 1OKC.

Identifiers
- Symbol: Aden_trnslctor
- Pfam: PF00153
- InterPro: IPR002113
- TCDB: 2.A.29.1.2
- OPM superfamily: 21
- OPM protein: 2c3e
Available protein structures:
- PDB: IPR002113 PF00153 (ECOD; PDBsum)
- AlphaFold: IPR002113; PF00153

solute carrier family 25 (mitochondrial carrier; adenine nucleotide translocator), member 4

Identifiers
- Symbol: SLC25A4
- Alt. symbols: PEO3, PEO2, ANT1
- NCBI gene: 291
- HGNC: 10990
- OMIM: 103220
- RefSeq: NM_001151
- UniProt: P12235

Other data
- Locus: Chr. 4 q35
Search for
- Structures: Swiss-model
- Domains: InterPro

solute carrier family 25 (mitochondrial carrier; adenine nucleotide translocator), member 5

Identifiers
- Symbol: SLC25A5
- Alt. symbols: ANT2
- NCBI gene: 292
- HGNC: 10991
- OMIM: 300150
- RefSeq: NM_001152
- UniProt: P05141

Other data
- Locus: Chr. X q24-q26
Search for
- Structures: Swiss-model
- Domains: InterPro

solute carrier family 25 (mitochondrial carrier; adenine nucleotide translocator), member 6

Identifiers
- Symbol: SLC25A6
- Alt. symbols: ANT3
- NCBI gene: 293
- HGNC: 10992
- OMIM: 403000
- RefSeq: NM_001636
- UniProt: P12236

Other data
- Locus: Chr. Y p
Search for
- Structures: Swiss-model
- Domains: InterPro

Adenine nucleotide translocator (ANT), also known as the ADP/ATP translocase (ANT), ADP/ATP carrier protein (AAC) or mitochondrial ADP/ATP carrier, exchanges free ATP with free ADP across the inner mitochondrial membrane. ANT is the most abundant protein in the inner mitochondrial membrane and belongs to the mitochondrial carrier family.

Free ADP is transported from the cytoplasm to the mitochondrial matrix, while ATP produced from oxidative phosphorylation is transported from the mitochondrial matrix to the cytoplasm, thus providing the cell with its main energy currency. ADP/ATP translocases are exclusive to eukaryotes and are thought to have evolved during eukaryogenesis. Human cells express four ADP/ATP translocases: SLC25A4, SLC25A5, SLC25A6 and SLC25A31, which constitute more than 10% of the protein in the inner mitochondrial membrane. These proteins are classified under the mitochondrial carrier superfamily.

== Types ==
In humans, there exist three paraologous ANT isoforms:

- SLC25A4 – found primarily in heart and skeletal muscle
- SLC25A5 – primarily expressed in fibroblasts
- SLC25A6 – primarily express in liver

== Structure ==
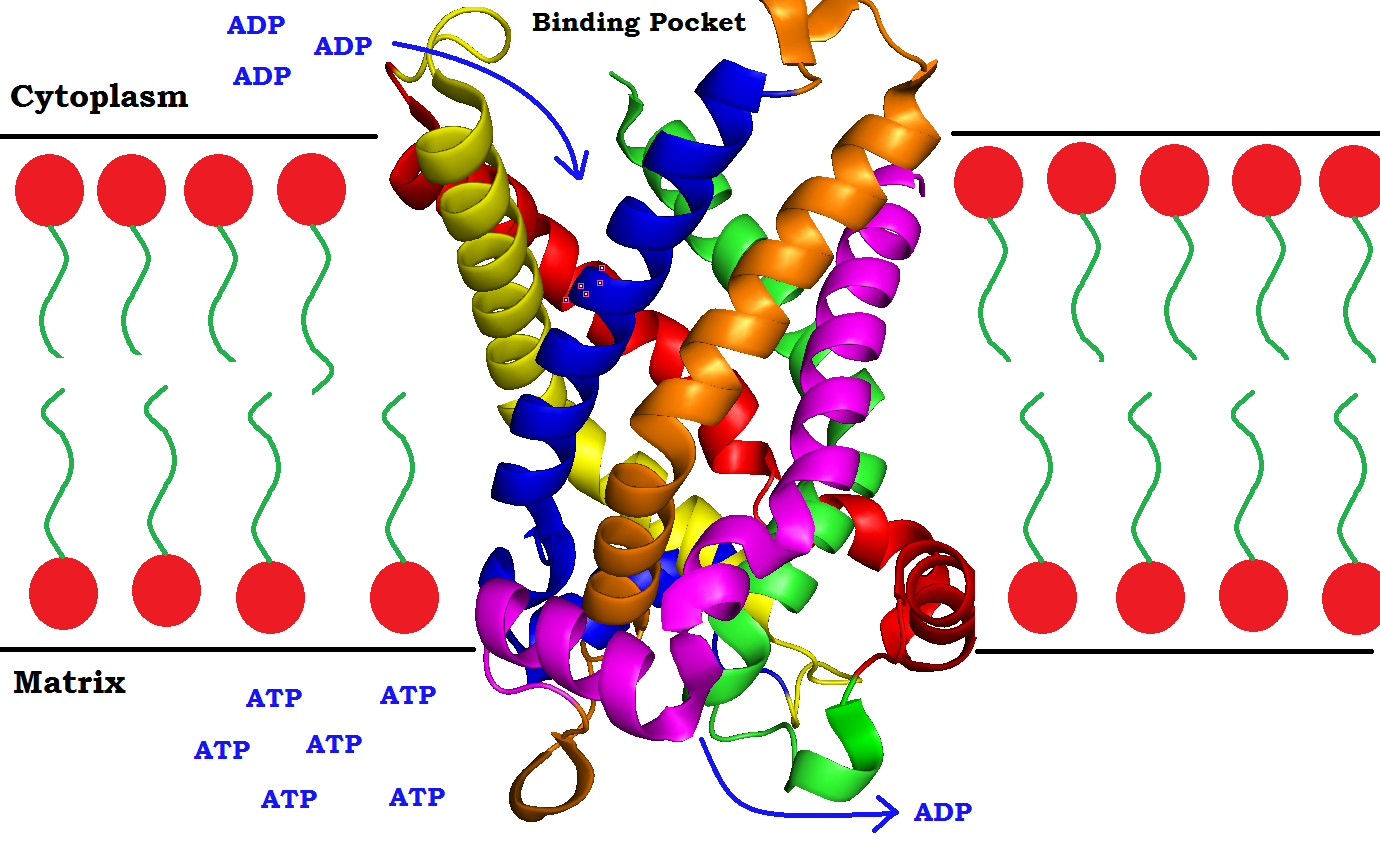
A side view of the translocase spanning the inner mitochondrial membrane. The six α-helices are denoted by different colors. The binding pocket is currently open to the cytoplasmic side and will bind to ADP, transporting it into the matrix. (From PDB: 1OKC)

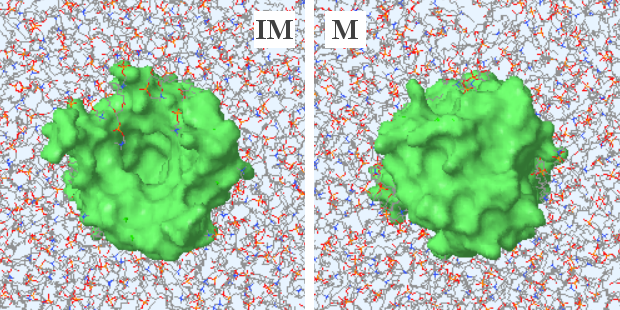
The translocase (as a molecular surface, green) viewed from both sides of a lipid bilayer representing the inner mitocondrial membrane. Left panel (IM): view from the intermembrane space. The protein is in the open conformation towards this side. Right panel (M): view from the matrix. The protein is closed towards this side.

ANT has long been thought to function as a homodimer, but this concept was challenged by the projection structure of the yeast Aac3p solved by electron crystallography, which showed that the protein was three-fold symmetric and monomeric, with the translocation pathway for the substrate through the centre. The atomic structure of the bovine ANT confirmed this notion, and provided the first structural fold of a mitochondrial carrier. Further work has demonstrated that ANT is a monomer in detergents and functions as a monomer in mitochondrial membranes.

ADP/ATP translocase 1 is the major AAC in human cells and the archetypal protein of this family. It has a mass of approximately 30 kDa, consisting of 297 residues. It forms six transmembrane α-helices that form a barrel that results in a deep cone-shaped depression accessible from the outside where the substrate binds. The binding pocket, conserved throughout most isoforms, mostly consists of basic residues that allow for strong binding to ATP or ADP and has a maximal diameter of 20 Å and a depth of 30 Å. Indeed, arginine residues 96, 204, 252, 253, and 294, as well as lysine 38, have been shown to be essential for transporter activity.

== Function ==
ADP/ATP translocase transports ATP synthesized from oxidative phosphorylation into the cytoplasm, where it can be used as the principal energy currency of the cell to power thermodynamically unfavorable reactions. After the consequent hydrolysis of ATP into ADP, ADP is transported back into the mitochondrial matrix, where it can be rephosphorylated to ATP. Because a human typically exchanges the equivalent of their own mass of ATP on a daily basis, ADP/ATP translocase is an important transporter protein with major metabolic implications.

ANT transports the free, i.e. deprotonated, non-Magnesium, non-Calcium bound forms of ADP and ATP, in a 1:1 ratio. Transport is fully reversible, and its directionality is governed by the concentrations of its substrates (ADP and ATP inside and outside mitochondria), the chelators of the adenine nucleotides, and the mitochondrial membrane potential. The relationship of these parameters can be expressed by an equation solving for the 'reversal potential of the ANT" (Erev_ANT), a value of the mitochondrial membrane potential at which no net transport of adenine nucleotides takes place by the ANT. The ANT and the F0-F1 ATP synthase are not necessarily in directional synchrony.

Apart from exchange of ADP and ATP across the inner mitochondrial membrane, the ANT also exhibits an intrinsic uncoupling activity

ANT is an important modulatory and possible structural component of the Mitochondrial Permeability Transition Pore, a channel involved in various pathologies whose function still remains elusive. Karch et al. propose a "multi-pore model" in which ANT is at least one of the molecular components of the pore.

=== Translocase mechanism ===
Under normal conditions, ATP and ADP cannot cross the inner mitochondrial membrane due to their high negative charges, but ADP/ATP translocase, an antiporter, couples the transport of the two molecules. The depression in ADP/ATP translocase alternatively faces the matrix and the cytoplasmic sides of the membrane. ADP in the intermembrane space, coming from the cytoplasm, binds the translocase and induces its eversion, resulting in the release of ADP into the matrix. Binding of ATP from the matrix induces eversion and results in the release of ATP into the intermembrane space, subsequently diffusing to the cytoplasm, and concomitantly brings the translocase back to its original conformation. ATP and ADP are the only natural nucleotides recognized by the translocase.

The net process is denoted by:

ADP^{3−}_{cytoplasm} + ATP^{4−}_{matrix} → ADP^{3−}_{matrix} + ATP^{4−}_{cytoplasm}

ADP/ATP exchange is energetically expensive: about 25% of the energy yielded from electron transfer by aerobic respiration, or one hydrogen ion, is consumed to regenerate the membrane potential that is tapped by ADP/ATP translocase.

The translocator cycles between two states, called the cytoplasmic and matrix state, opening up to these compartments in an alternating way. There are structures available that show the translocator locked in a cytoplasmic state by the inhibitor carboxyatractyloside, or in the matrix state by the inhibitor bongkrekic acid.

== Alterations ==
Rare but severe diseases such as mitochondrial myopathies are associated with dysfunctional human ADP/ATP translocase. Mitochondrial myopathies (MM) refer to a group of clinically and biochemically heterogeneous disorders that share common features of major mitochondrial structural abnormalities in skeletal muscle. The major morphological hallmark of MM is ragged, red fibers containing peripheral and intermyofibrillar accumulations of abnormal mitochondria. In particular, autosomal dominant progressive external ophthalmoplegia (adPEO) is a common disorder associated with dysfunctional ADP/ATP translocase and can induce paralysis of muscles responsible for eye movements. General symptoms are not limited to the eyes and can include exercise intolerance, muscle weakness, hearing deficit, and more. adPEO shows Mendelian inheritance patterns but is characterized by large-scale mitochondrial DNA (mtDNA) deletions. mtDNA contains few introns, or non-coding regions of DNA, which increases the likelihood of deleterious mutations. Thus, any modification of ADP/ATP translocase mtDNA can lead to a dysfunctional transporter, particularly residues involved in the binding pocket which will compromise translocase efficacy. MM is commonly associated with dysfunctional ADP/ATP translocase, but MM can be induced through many different mitochondrial abnormalities.

=== Inhibition ===
Bongkrekic acid

ADP/ATP translocase is very specifically inhibited by two families of compounds. The first family, which includes atractyloside (ATR) and carboxyatractyloside (CATR), binds to the ADP/ATP translocase from the cytoplasmic side, locking it in a cytoplasmic side open conformation. In contrast, the second family, which includes bongkrekic acid (BA) and isobongkrekic acid (isoBA), binds the translocase from the matrix, locking it in a matrix side open conformation. The negatively charged groups of the inhibitors bind strongly to the positively charged residues deep within the binding pocket. The high affinity (K_{d} in the nanomolar range) makes each inhibitor a deadly poison by obstructing cellular respiration/energy transfer to the rest of the cell. There are structures available that show the translocator locked in a cytoplasmic state by the inhibitor carboxyatractyloside, or in the matrix state by the inhibitor bongkrekic acid.

== History ==
In 1955, Siekevitz and Potter demonstrated that adenine nucleotides were distributed in cells in two pools located in the mitochondrial and cytosolic compartments. Shortly thereafter, Pressman hypothesized that the two pools could exchange nucleotides. However, the existence of an ADP/ATP transporter was not postulated until 1964 when Bruni et al. uncovered an inhibitory effect of atractyloside on the energy-transfer system (oxidative phosphorylation) and ADP binding sites of rat liver mitochondria.

Soon after, an overwhelming amount of research was done in proving the existence and elucidating the link between ADP/ATP translocase and energy transport. cDNA of ADP/ATP translocase was sequenced for bovine in 1982 and a yeast species Saccharomyces cerevisiae in 1986 before finally Battini et al. sequenced a cDNA clone of the human transporter in 1989. The homology in the coding sequences between human and yeast ADP/ATP translocase was 47% while bovine and human sequences extended remarkable to 266 out of 297 residues, or 89.6%. In both cases, the most conserved residues lie in the ADP/ATP substrate binding pocket.

== See also ==
- Mitochondrial carrier
- Cellular respiration
- Oxidative phosphorylation
