= ANTKMT =

Protein-coding gene found in humans

Identifiers
- Aliases: ANTKMT, C16orf24, family with sequence similarity 173 member A, adenine nucleotide translocase lysine methyltransferase, FAM173A, ANT-KMT
- External IDs: MGI: 2384888; GeneCards: ANTKMT

Gene location (Human)
Chr.	Chromosome 16 (human)
Band	16p13.3	Start	720,581 bp
Band	16p13.3	End	722,590 bp

Gene location (Mouse)
Chr.	Chromosome 17 (mouse)
Band	17|17 A3.3	Start	26,009,054 bp
Band	17|17 A3.3	End	26,011,875 bp
RNA expression pattern
Bgee	Human / Mouse (ortholog); Top expressed in: anterior cingulate cortex; mucosa of transverse colon; right testis; right frontal lobe; left testis; amygdala; apex of heart; testicle; Brodmann area 9; prefrontal cortex / Top expressed in: choroid plexus; choroid plexus of fourth ventricle; spermatocyte; islet of Langerhans; proximal tubule; right kidney; superior colliculus; inferior colliculi; bone marrow; pons; More reference expression data
BioGPS	n/a
Gene ontology
Molecular function	methyltransferase activity; transferase activity; protein-lysine N-methyltransferase activity
Cellular component	membrane; integral component of membrane
Biological process	methylation; peptidyl-lysine methylation
Sources:Amigo / QuickGO
Orthologs
Databases	NCBI: entry; OMA: entry
Species	Human	Mouse
Entrez	65990	214917
Ensembl	ENSG00000103254	ENSMUSG00000057411
UniProt	Q9BQD7	Q501J2
RefSeq (mRNA)	NM_001271285; NM_023933	NM_001285982; NM_145410; NM_001357989
RefSeq (protein)	NP_001258214; NP_076422	NP_001272911; NP_663385; NP_001344918
Location (UCSC)	Chr 16: 0.72 – 0.72 Mb	Chr 17: 26.01 – 26.01 Mb
PubMed search
- Wikidata
View/Edit Human	View/Edit Mouse

Adenine nucleotide translocase lysine N-methyltransferase is an enzyme that in humans is encoded by the ANTKMT gene (previously FAM173A). This enzyme is involved in regulating cellular respiration in the mitochondria. In particular it functions to (tri)methylate the transporters SLC25A5 (ANT2) and SLC25A6 (ANT3), and probably SLC25A4 (ANT1) as well.

== Enzyme activity ==
This enzyme catalyzes the following reaction:

L-lysyl-[protein] + 3 S-adenosyl-L-methionine → N6,N6,N6-trimethyl-L-lysyl-[protein] + 3 S-adenosyl-L-homocysteine + 3 H+
