= Atractyloside =

- Structure formula of atractyloside

Names
- Other names: ATR; Atractylate; Atractylic Acid

Identifiers
CAS Number	1398-13-6; K salt: 102130-43-8; 17754-44-8
3D model (JSmol)	Interactive image; K salt: Interactive image
ChemSpider	390564; K salt: 390563
ECHA InfoCard	100.162.426
EC Number	K salt: 634-446-8
PubChem CID	442005; K salt: 5702200
UNII	K salt: H6WC6L09RM
CompTox Dashboard (EPA)	DTXSID60907147
- InChI: InChI=1S/C30H46O16S2/c1-14(2)9-22(32)44-25-24(46-48(39,40)41)23(45-47(36,37)38)20(13-31)43-28(25)42-17-10-18(27(34)35)19-7-8-30-11-16(15(3)26(30)33)5-6-21(30)29(19,4)12-17/h14,16-21,23-26,28,31,33H,3,5-13H2,1-2,4H3,(H,34,35)(H,36,37,38)(H,39,40,41)/t16-,17-,18-,19-,20-,21+,23-,24+,25-,26+,28-,29-,30-/m1/s1 Key: FYQXODZRNSCOTR-QLKRWLHJSA-N; K salt: InChI=1S/C30H46O16S2.2K/c1-14(2)9-22(32)44-25-24(46-48(39,40)41)23(45-47(36,37)38)20(13-31)43-28(25)42-17-10-18(27(34)35)19-7-8-30-11-16(15(3)26(30)33)5-6-21(30)29(19,4)12-17;;/h14,16-21,23-26,28,31,33H,3,5-13H2,1-2,4H3,(H,34,35)(H,36,37,38)(H,39,40,41);;/q;2*+1/p-2/t16-,17-,18-,19-,20-,21+,23-,24+,25-,26+,28-,29-,30-;;/m1../s1 Key: IUCNQFHEWLYECJ-FNAJZLPOSA-L
- SMILES: CC(C)CC(=O)O[C@@H]1[C@H]([C@@H]([C@H](O[C@H]1O[C@@H]2C[C@H]([C@H]3CC[C@@]45C[C@@H](CC[C@H]4[C@@]3(C2)C)C(=C)[C@@H]5O)C(=O)O)CO)OS(=O)(=O)O)OS(=O)(=O)O; K salt: C=C1[C@@H]2CC[C@H]3[C@]4(C)C[C@H](O[C@@H]5O[C@H](CO)[C@@H](OS(=O)(=O)[O-])[C@H](OS(=O)(=O)[O-])[C@H]5OC(=O)CC(C)C)C[C@@H](C(=O)O)[C@H]4CC[C@]3(C2)[C@H]1O.[K+].[K+]

Properties
Chemical formula	C_{30}H_{46}O_{16}S_{2}
Molar mass	726,81 g·mol^{−1}
- Except where otherwise noted, data are given for materials in their standard state (at 25 °C [77 °F], 100 kPa). Infobox references

Atractyloside (ATR) is a natural, toxic glycoside present in numerous plant species worldwide in the daisy family including Atractylis gummifera and Callilepis laureola, and it's used for a variety of therapeutic, religious, and toxic purposes. Exposure to ATR via ingestion or physical contact is toxic and can be fatal for both humans and animals, especially by kidney and liver failure. ATR acts as an effective ADP/ATP translocase inhibitor which eventually halts ADP and ATP exchange and the cell dies due to lack of energy. Historically, atractyloside poisoning has been challenging to verify and quantify toxicologically, though recent literature has described such methods within acceptable standards of forensic science.

== Sources ==
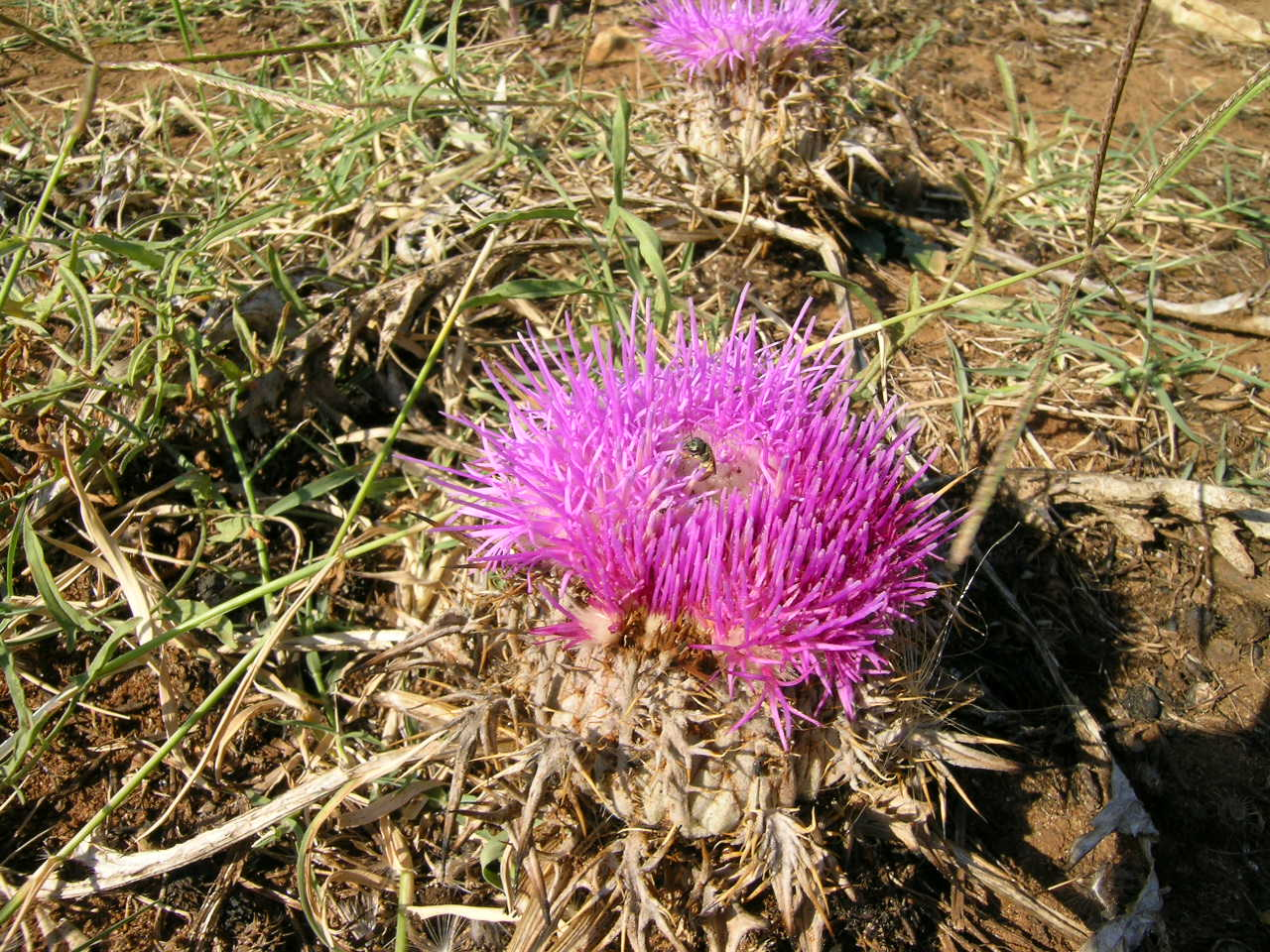
Distaff thistle (Atractylis gummifera) contains atractyloside

Atractyloside is found in numerous plant species in the daisy family e.g. Atractylis gummifera, Callilepis laureola, Xanthium strumarium, Iphiona alsoeri, Pascalia glauca, Wedelia glauca, and Iphiona aucheri among others. It is also found in very low concentrations in Coffea arabica.

The widespread regions across all of these plants' native areas of growth results in ATR's easy availability worldwide.

However the ATR concentration found in plants is dependent upon the species, season, and origin. For example, the ATR content measured in dried Atractlyis gummifera between Sardinia, Italy and Sicily, Italy revealed a higher content in the Sicilian region by nearly a factor of five, and a higher content in colder months across both regions.

Additionally, the preparation of plants with atractyloside in some traditional medicines affects the atractyloside content. The preparation technique, such as decoction or infusion, extracts the desired chemical compound, after which the contents could be diluted or concentrated.

== History ==
Atractylosides have been used as poisons since at least 100 AD, though it was not isolated and characterized until 1868 by LeFranc, after extracting it from Atractylis gummifera. After high-profile accidental poisonings—children in Italy and Algeria ate parts of the plant in 1955 and 1975, respectively—renewed interest in atractyloside resulted in future research.

Historically, the ATR plant sources have been used for numerous reasons: whether for its therapeutic properties, magico-religious purposes, or its toxicity. While its therapeutic uses may be due to the coincidental presence of other compounds, some uses of ATR-containing plants include treating sinusitis, headaches, syphilitic ulcers, and whitening teeth among other applications. Separately, the Atractylis gummifera is a traditional herb used in North Africa while Callilepis laureola is well known to the Zulu people in South Africa for both therapeutical applications and its spiritual context to ward away evil spirits.

When in high dosages, ATR's toxicity has been utilized for suicide and murder, though there have been no especially high-profile incidents reported, at least somewhat due to difficulties identifying ATR poisoning. More commonly than suicide or murder, ATR is a result of accidental poisoning: livestock grazing can poison animals, while an unintended overdose or exposure of a plant containing ATR can poison humans. Particularly, the Atractylis gummifera is easily confused with wild artichoke and other vegetables, and its sweet-tasting roots facilitate its consumption.

== Structure and reactivity ==
Atractyloside is a hydrophilic glycoside. A modified glucose is linked to the hydrophobic diterpene atractyligenin by a β1-glycosidic bond. A carboxyl group is positioned at the C4 position in the axial position. The glucose part is esterified with isovaleric acid on the C2' atom, and sulfuric acid on the C3' and C4' atoms. By hydrolysis a molecule of D-(+)-glucose, isovaleric acid, atractyligenin, and two molecules of sulfuric acid could be obtained. The two sulfate groups and the carboxyl group in ATR are in a deprotonated form under physiological conditions. Thus, ATR is triple negatively charged.

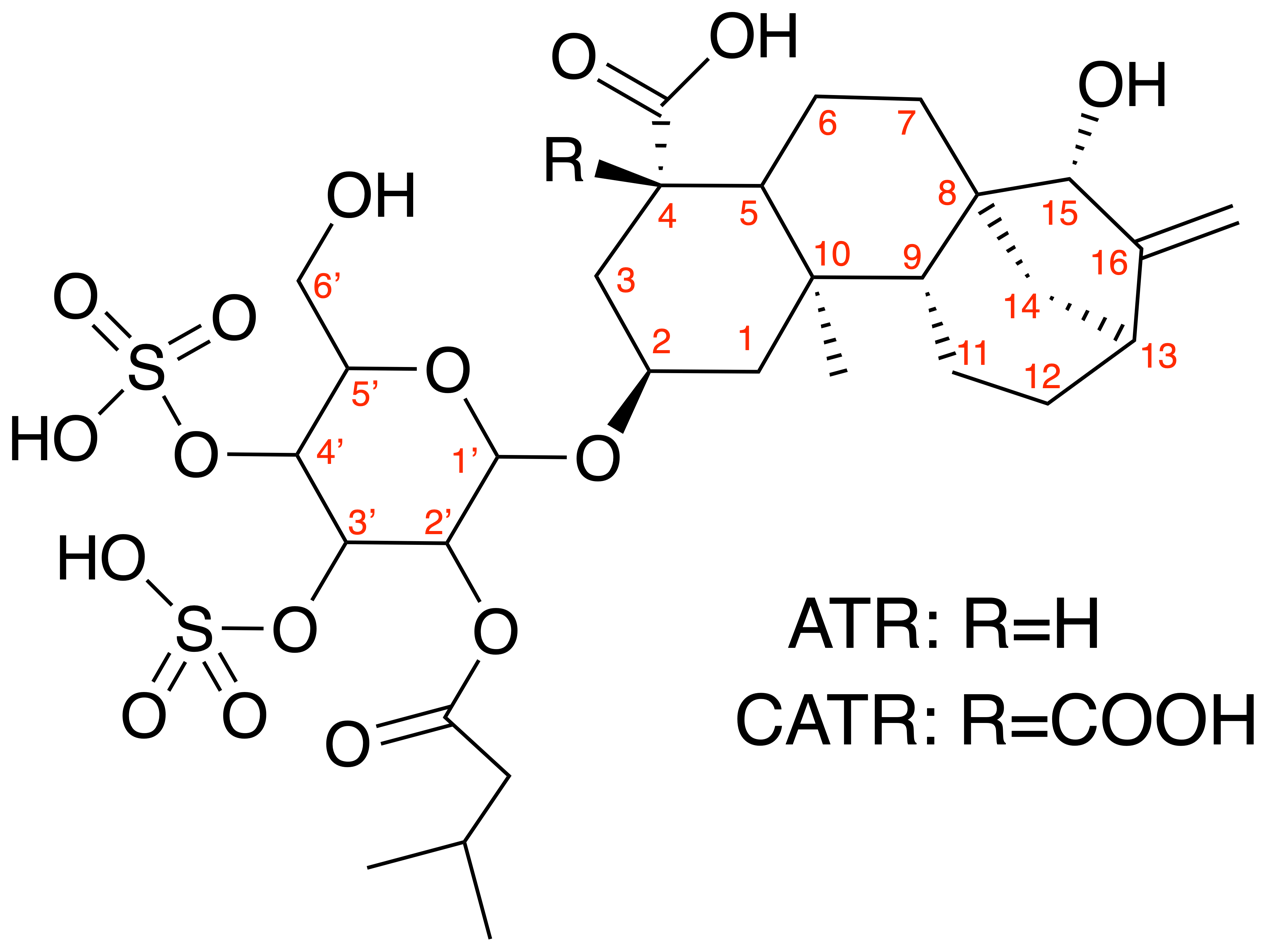
Numbered chemical structure of protonated ATR/CATR. The R group difference is depicted for ATR and CATR.

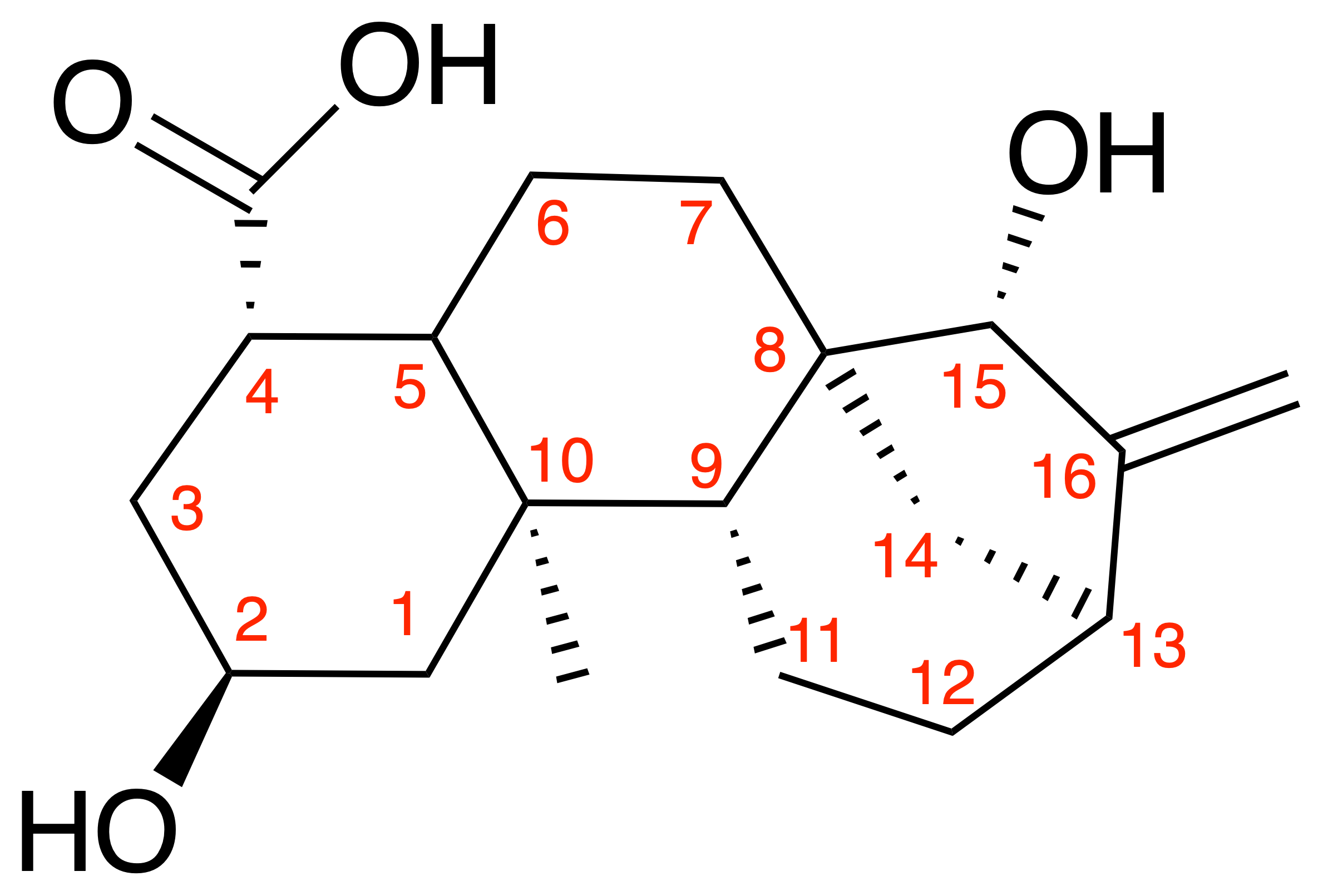
Numbered atractyligenin chemical structure.

A modified variant of the atractylenolide carries an additional carboxyl group at the C4 atom of the atractyligenin, which is then referred to as carboxy-atractyloside (CATR), sometimes referred to as "gummiferin". The ATR/CATR chemical structure on the right indicates this difference between compounds.

== Mechanism of action ==
In biochemical studies of mitochondria, the effect of atractyloside on the ADP/ATP transport was recognized even before the actual transporter was identified. ATR or CATR bind to the ADP/ATP translocase, which is located on the inner mitochondrial membrane. ATR binds competitively to the translocase competitive up to a concentration of 5 mmol while CATR binds in a non-competitive manner. As a result, the exchange of ADP and ATP is no longer carried out and the cell dies due to lack of energy.

The chemical structure and charge distribution of atractyloside is similar to that of ADP: the sulfate groups correspond to the phosphate groups, the glucose part corresponds to the ribose part, and the hydrophobic atractyligenine residue corresponds to the hydrophobic purine residue of ADP.

The carboxyl group on the C4 atom of the atractyligenin is important for toxicity. If this is reduced to a hydroxyl group (atractylitriol), the substance becomes non-toxic. Modification of any of the sulfate groups renders the compound non-toxic. On the other hand, the free hydroxy group on the C6 atom of the glucose moiety can be modified without loss of compound potency.

== Poisoning ==
=== Symptoms ===
Consumption of atractyloside (ATR) in plants will oftentimes also contain carboxyatractyloside (CATR), a highly toxic glycoside.

Ingestion of A. gummifera, C. laureola, Xanthium, or their extracts, may result in symptoms of gastrointestinal pain, nausea, diarrhea, and vomiting. Also possible is respiratory depression which may cause hypoxemia, leading to tissue hypoxia, spasms, stiffness, and convulsions. In several cases, these symptoms are followed by coma. Postmortem analysis may indicate hepatocellular damage and renal failure.

More recent literature has described sustained application of ATR on skin causing the symptoms described above, including hepatorenal injury.

=== Identification / Quantification ===
The detection of herbal toxins has generally caused a diagnostic problem due to wide variety of plants and limited standard screening. For a long time, the identification of ATR poisoning was limited to postmortem analysis of one's kidneys or liver. Subsequent developments made to identify the presence of ATR in bodily fluids (blood or urine) only worked with high concentrations of ATR. Now, more recent research has established the necessary sensitivity and specificity to be applied to forensic toxicology.

The development of the below procedure relied on findings from unsuccessful methods of identification, primarily traced to the following literature in which the specificity and sensitivity was improved over time. Due to the limited research on the subject of ATR identification, this literature represents the primary sources to review:

- 1999: Established first quantifiable measurement of atractyloside in whole blood with high-performance liquid chromatography-tandem mass spectrometry (HPLC-MS-MS);
- 2001: GC-MS method required derivitization to detect atractyloside fragments;
- 2004: LC-MS (EI) using Waters Thermabeam detector resulted in complete fragmentation of the molecule; gentler ionization technique (ESI) was successfully used to detect ATR after chromatographic separation;
- 2006: Further development of procedure with ESI, eluent composition, and other experimental conditions, though still lacking specificity for forensic science.

The procedure by Carlier et al. uses high-performance liquid chromatography coupled with high-resolution tandem mass spectrometry (HPLC-HRMS/MS). After the extraction of ATR and CATR from the blood or urine sample, separation was performed by reverse-phase HPLC. The MS detection used a quadrupole-orbitrap high-resolution detector after heated electrospray in negative ionization mode. These extraction techniques yielded 71.1% and 48.3% of ATR and CATR, respectively, in which these results met acceptable international criteria for forensic science: precision (≤15% or ≤20% at the LLOQ) and accuracy (between 80 and 115% or 80-120% at the LLOQ).

For reference, additional sources have fully characterized atractyloside in NMR, MS, IR, etc.

=== Lethality ===
The mean lethal dose in rats (i.p.) for ATR is 143 mg/kg and for CATR is 2.9 mg/kg. This lethal dose of ATR takes approximately 150–180 minutes after injection until acute tubular necrosis occurred. This lethal dose varies across species and method of exposure. For example, the mean lethal dose of ATR in rats (s.c.) is 155 mg/kg. Published mean lethal doses of ATR in other species includes 250 mg/kg (s.c.) for rabbit, 200 mg/kg (i.p.) for guinea pig, and 15 mg/kg (i.v.) for dog.

== See also ==
- Carboxyatractyloside
