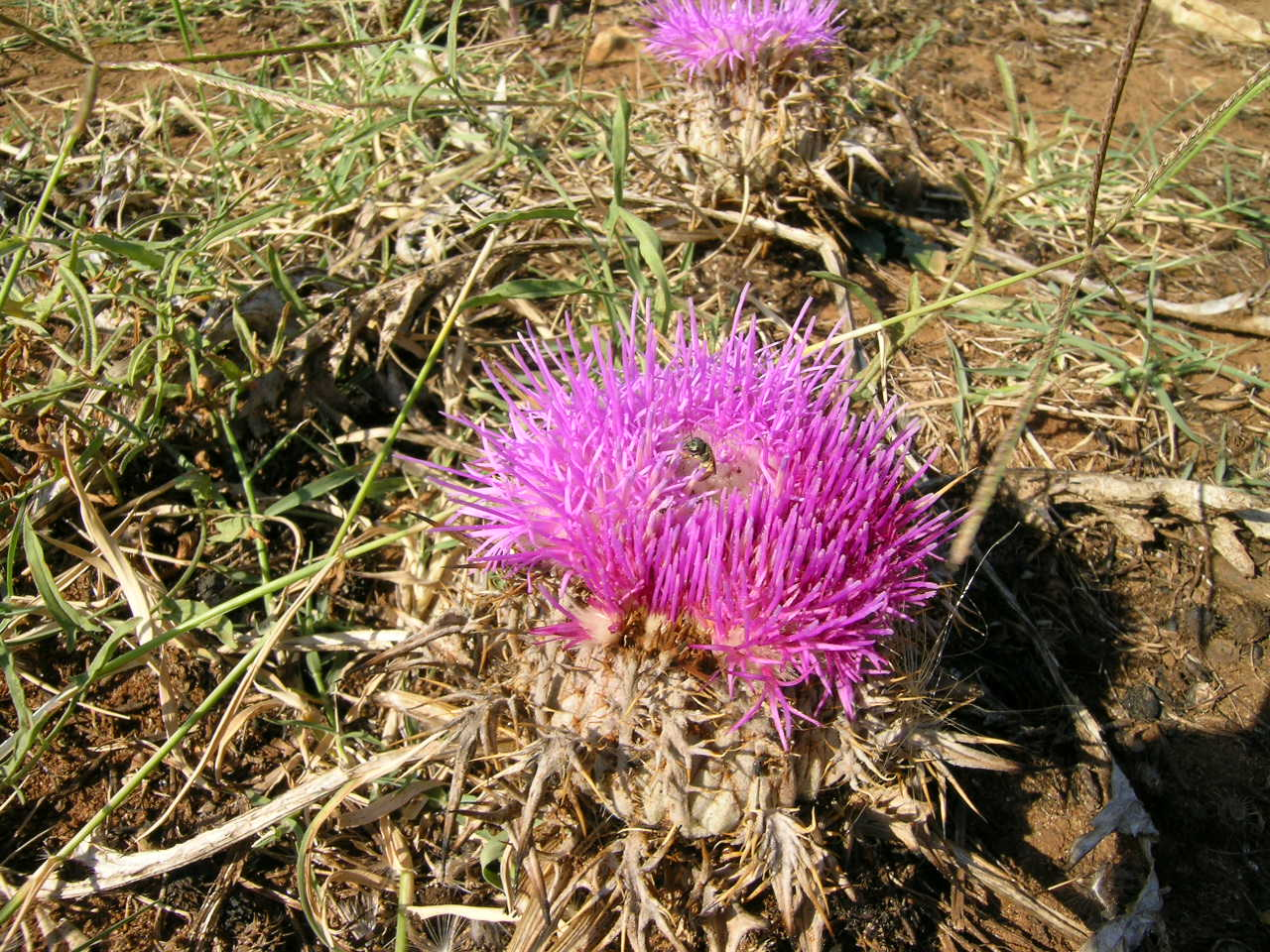
- Flowering specimen of Chamaeleon gummifer

Conservation status
- Least Concern (IUCN 3.1)

Scientific classification
- Kingdom: Plantae
- Clade: Tracheophytes
- Clade: Angiosperms
- Clade: Eudicots
- Clade: Asterids
- Order: Asterales
- Family: Asteraceae
- Genus: Chamaeleon
- Species: C. gummifer

Binomial name
- Chamaeleon gummifer (L.) Cass.

Synonyms
- Acarna gummifera (L.) Willd.; Acarna macrocephala Willd.; Atractylis acaulis Pers.; Atractylis gummifera L.; Atractylis macrocephala Desf.; Atractylis nemotoiana Arènes; Carlina fontanesii DC.; Carlina gummifera (L.) Less.; Carlina macrocephala Less.; Carthamus gummiferus (L.) Lam.; Cirsellium gummiferum (L.) Brot.

= Chamaeleon gummifer =

Species of flowering plant

Chamaeleon gummifer, also known as distaff thistle, piney thistle or stemless atractylis, is a thistle in the Chamaeleon genus. Formerly, it was placed in the Atractylis genus. It is native to the Mediterranean basin, where it can be found in various habitats, including cultivated- or uncultivated fields and forests. It is a perennial herb producing a stemless, pinkish flower. The plant has a history of use in folk medicine, but it is very toxic due to the presence of atractyloside and carboxyatractyloside.

== Description ==
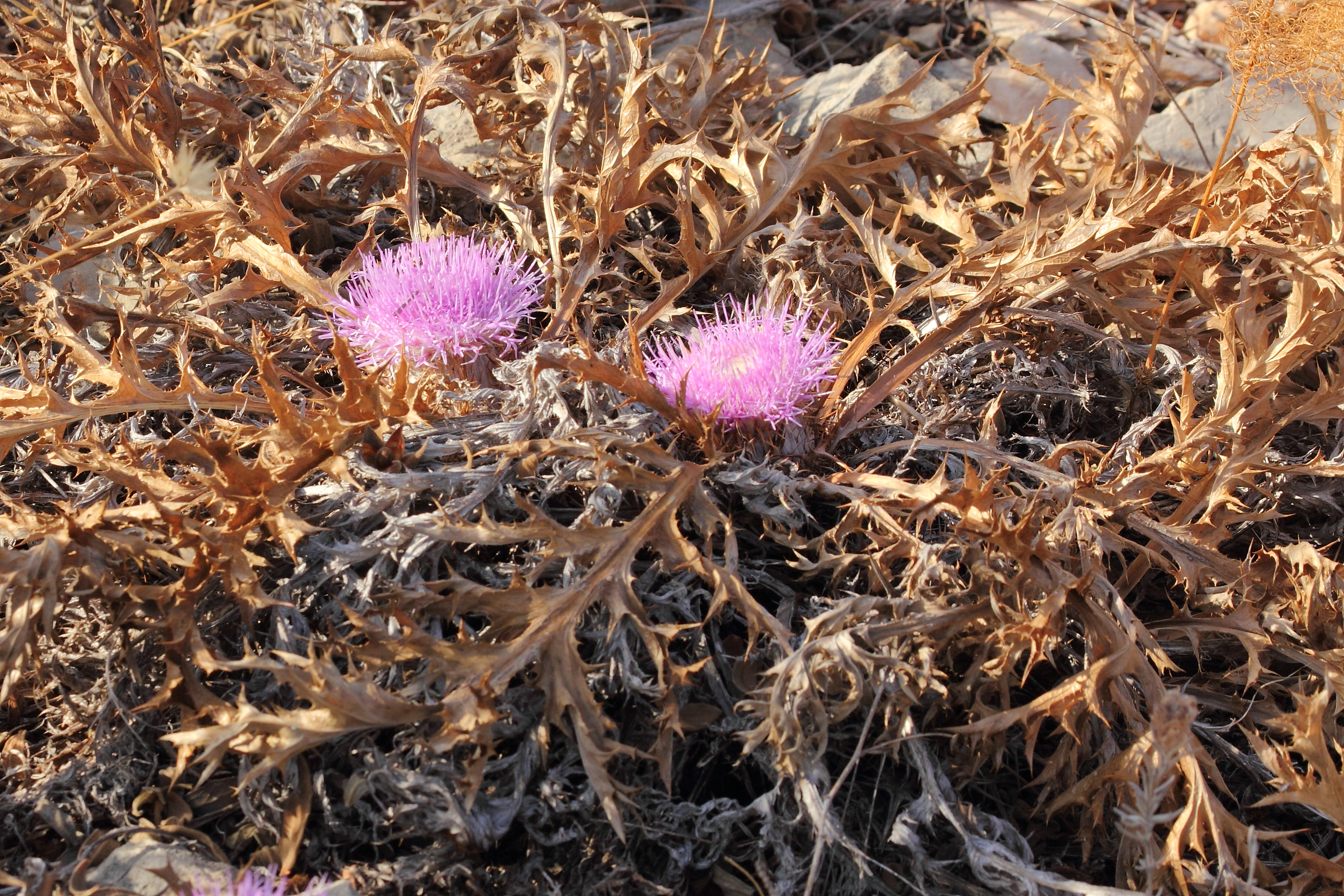
Two Chamaeleon gummifer plants showing inflorescence and dried-out leaves

Chamaeleon gummifer is a perennial thistle with a long rhizome extending up to 40 cm and spiky leaves emanating from its center. A pinkish inflorescence grows in the center, seen as a capitulum consisting of many small threadlike flowers. The inflorescence is surrounded by spiny bracts. Unusual compared to other thistles is the fact that the inflorescence of Chamaeleon gummifer does not grow on a stem. The ripe fruit of the plant may ooze a white or yellowish gummy latex produced by the rhizome. Chamaeleon gummifer flowers in late summer or early autumn.

== Distribution ==
Chamaeleon gummifer can be found along the Mediterranean basin, including Northern Africa, the Iberian Peninsula, Italy, Greece and Malta. It grows in various habitats and on various substrates, including in cultivated- or uncultivated fields, shrublands, forests and in rocklands. It is rated as Least Concern on the IUCN Red List.

== Toxicity ==
The toxicity of Chamaeleon gummifer is thought to be caused by two related glycosides, atractyloside and carboxyatractyloside. In Morocco, Chamaeleon gummifer is a common cause of plant poisoning, with children being especially vulnerable to severe effects. Accidental ingestion of the plant can be due to confusion with the artichoke thistle, or due to use of its gummy discharge as a chewing gum. Fatal cases of poisoning are common, even with treatment of symptoms. At least 98 fatalities occurred due to Chamaeleon gummifer poisoning in Morocco between 1981 and 2004, most of whom were children under the age of 16. Severe cases may be associated with liver and kidney failure. There is currently no specific treatment to poisoning by Chamaeleon gummifer.
