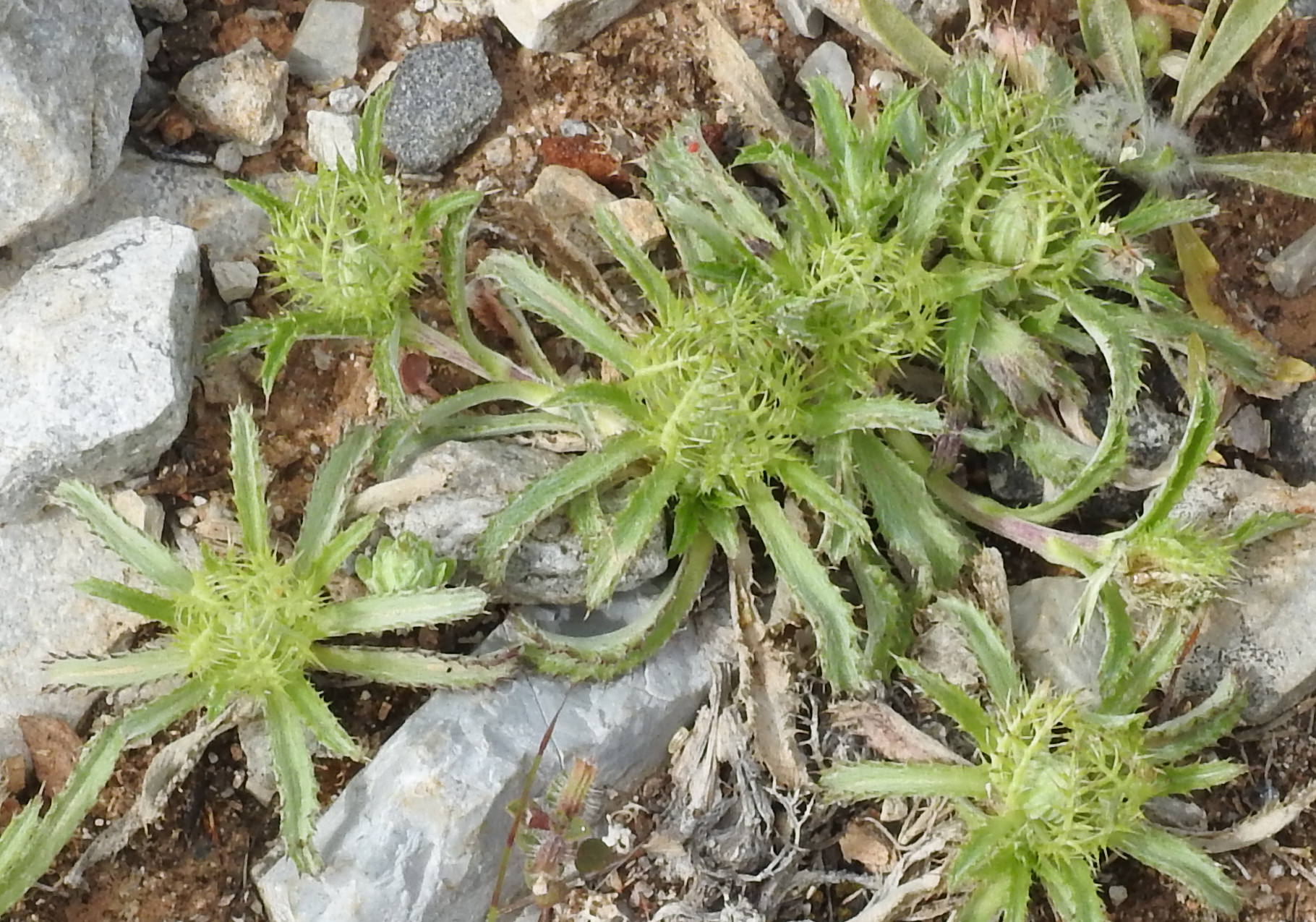

Scientific classification
- Kingdom: Plantae
- Clade: Embryophytes
- Clade: Tracheophytes
- Clade: Spermatophytes
- Clade: Angiosperms
- Clade: Eudicots
- Clade: Asterids
- Order: Asterales
- Family: Asteraceae
- Genus: Atractylis
- Species: A. cancellata

Binomial name
- Atractylis cancellata L.

= Atractylis cancellata =

Species of plant

Atractylis cancellata, known by the common name cage thistle, is a species of annual herb in the family Asteraceae. They have a self-supporting growth form and simple, broad leaves and dry fruit. Individuals can grow to 2 cm (0.79 in) tall.

== Sources ==
This article incorporates text from a free content work. Licensed under CC0 (license statement/permission). Text taken from Atractylis cancellata. Encyclopedia of Life.
