= Carboxyatractyloside =

Names
- IUPAC name 15α-Hydroxy-2β-[2-O-(3-methylbutanoyl)-3,4-di-O-sulfono-β-D-glucopyranosyloxy]-5β,8α,9β,10α,13α-kaur-16-ene-18,19-dioic acid
- Systematic IUPAC name (2S,4aS,6aR,7S,9R,11aS,11bS)-7-Hydroxy-2-({(2R,3R,4R,5R,6R)-6-(hydroxymethyl)-3-[(3-methylbutanoyl)oxy]oxan-2-yl}oxy)-11b-methyl-8-methylidenedodecahydro-6a,9-methanocyclohepta[a]naphthalene-4,4(1H)-dicarboxylic acid
- Other names CATR

Identifiers
CAS Number	33286-30-5
3D model (JSmol)	Interactive image
ChemSpider	16737649
DrugBank	DB02426
EC Number	251-444-9
PubChem CID	20055804
UNII	SNP1XL23E6
- InChI: InChI=1S/C31H46O18S2/c1-14(2)9-21(33)47-24-23(49-51(42,43)44)22(48-50(39,40)41)18(13-32)46-26(24)45-17-11-29(4)19-6-5-16-10-30(19,25(34)15(16)3)8-7-20(29)31(12-17,27(35)36)28(37)38/h14,16-20,22-26,32,34H,3,5-13H2,1-2,4H3,(H,35,36)(H,37,38)(H,39,40,41)(H,42,43,44)/t16-,17+,18-,19+,20+,22-,23+,24-,25+,26-,29+,30-/m1/s1 Key: AQFATIOBERWBDY-LNQSNDDKSA-N
- SMILES: CC(CC(=O)O[C@H]1[C@@H](O[C@@H]([C@H]([C@@H]1OS(=O)(=O)O)OS(=O)(=O)O)CO)O[C@@H]2C[C@@]([C@@H]3[C@@](C2)([C@H]4[C@@]5([C@H](C(=C)[C@@H](C5)CC4)O)CC3)C)(C(=O)O)C(=O)O)C

Properties
Chemical formula	C_{31}H_{46}O_{18}S_{2}
Molar mass	770.81 g·mol^{−1}
- Except where otherwise noted, data are given for materials in their standard state (at 25 °C [77 °F], 100 kPa). Infobox references

Carboxyatractyloside (CATR) is a highly toxic diterpene glycoside that inhibits the ADP/ATP translocase. It is about 10 times more potent than its analog atractyloside. While atractyloside is effective in the inhibition of oxidative phosphorylation, carboxyatractyloside is considered to be more effective. The effects of carboxyatractyloside on the ADP/ATP translocase are not reversed by increasing the concentration of adenine nucleotides, unlike its counterpart atractyloside. Carboxyatractyloside behavior resembles bongkrekic acid while in the mitochondria. Carboxyatractyloside is poisonous to humans as well as livestock, including cows and horses.

Symptoms of carboxyatractyloside poisoning may include abdominal pain, nausea and vomiting, drowsiness, palpitations, sweating and trouble breathing. In severe cases, convulsions, liver failure and loss of consciousness may develop, which can lead to death.

Carboxyatractyloside can be found in Xanthium species plants, including Xanthium strumarium. Consumption of Xanthium containing the toxin led to the deaths of at least 19 people in Sylhet, Bangladesh during a period of food scarcity. Along with atractyloside, it is also one of the main poisonous substances in the Atractylis gummifera thistle.
