= ADP/ATP translocase 4 =

Protein found in humans

SLC25A31

Identifiers
- Aliases: SLC25A31, AAC4, ANT4, SFEC35kDa, ANT 4, solute carrier family 25 member 31
- External IDs: OMIM: 610796; MGI: 1920583; GeneCards: SLC25A31

Gene location (Human)
Chr.	Chromosome 4 (human)
Band	4q28.1	Start	127,730,400 bp
Band	4q28.1	End	127,774,292 bp

Gene location (Mouse)
Chr.	Chromosome 3 (mouse)
Band	3|3 B	Start	40,663,285 bp
Band	3|3 B	End	40,680,527 bp
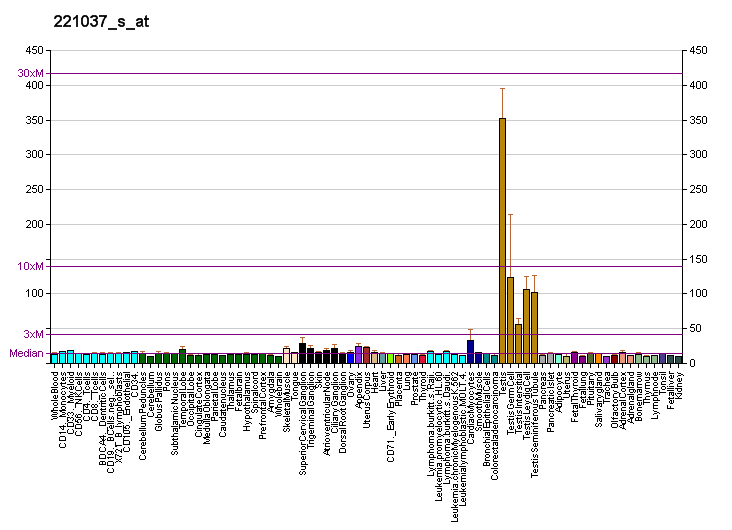
RNA expression pattern
Bgee	Human / Mouse (ortholog); Top expressed in: right testis; left testis; gonad; sperm; testicle; lower lobe of lung; pancreatic epithelial cell; pancreatic ductal cell; tibialis anterior muscle; skin of thigh / Top expressed in: spermatocyte; primary oocyte; spermatid; zygote; right lung; secondary oocyte; testicle; urethra; left lung; embryo; More reference expression data
BioGPS	More reference expression data
Gene ontology
Molecular function	transporter activity; transmembrane transporter activity; ATP:ADP antiporter activity
Cellular component	cell projection; motile cilium; cilium; membrane; mitochondrion; nucleus; mitochondrial inner membrane; integral component of membrane
Biological process	transmembrane transport; mitochondrial transport; transport; ADP transport; ATP transport
Sources:Amigo / QuickGO
Orthologs
Databases	NCBI: entry; OMA: entry
Species	Human	Mouse
Entrez	83447	73333
Ensembl	ENSG00000151475	ENSMUSG00000069041
UniProt	Q9H0C2	Q3V132
RefSeq (mRNA)	NM_031291; NM_001318467	NM_178386
RefSeq (protein)	NP_001305396; NP_112581	NP_848473
Location (UCSC)	Chr 4: 127.73 – 127.77 Mb	Chr 3: 40.66 – 40.68 Mb
PubMed search
- Wikidata
View/Edit Human	View/Edit Mouse

ADP/ATP translocase 4 (ANT4) is an enzyme that in humans is encoded by the SLC25A31 gene on chromosome 4. This enzyme inhibits apoptosis by catalyzing ADP/ATP exchange across the mitochondrial membranes and regulating membrane potential. In particular, ANT4 is essential to spermatogenesis, as it imports ATP into sperm mitochondria to support their development and survival. Outside this role, the SLC25AC31 gene has not been implicated in any human disease.

== Structure ==
The ANT4 protein contains six transmembrane helices, and a homodimer functional unit, which serves as an ADP/ATP channel protein. Unlike the other three ANT isoforms, ANT4 has additional amino acids at its N- and C-terminals. These amino acid sequences may interact with different factors for specialized functions such as localization to sperm flagella. The SLC25A31 gene is composed of 6 exons over a stretch of 44 kbp of DNA.

== Function ==
The ANT4 protein is a mitochondrial ADP/ATP carrier that catalyzes the exchange of ADP and ATP between the mitochondrial matrix and cytoplasm during ATP synthesis. In addition, ANT4 stabilizes the mitochondrial membrane potential and decreases the permeability transition pore complex (PTPC) opening in order to prevent nuclear chromatin fragmentation and resulting cell death. In humans, the protein localizes to the liver, brain and testis, though in adult males, it is expressed primarily in the testis. Studies on Ant4-deficient mice reveal increased apoptosis in the testis leading to infertility, thus indicating that Ant4 is required as for spermatogenesis. In this case, the anti-apoptotic function for ANT4 is attributed to its importing of cytosolic ATP into the mitochondria. In other cells, the isoform ANT2 carries out this role; however, since sperm lack the X chromosome on which the ANT2 gene resides, survival of the sperm is dependent on ANT4.

== Clinical significance ==
The SLC25A31 enzyme is an important constituent in apoptotic signaling and oxidative stress, most notably as part of the mitochondrial death pathway and cardiac myocyte apoptosis signaling. Programmed cell death is a distinct genetic and biochemical pathway essential to metazoans. An intact death pathway is required for successful embryonic development and the maintenance of normal tissue homeostasis. Apoptosis has proven to be tightly interwoven with other essential cell pathways. The identification of critical control points in the cell death pathway has yielded fundamental insights for basic biology, as well as provided rational targets for new therapeutics a normal embryologic processes, or during cell injury (such as ischemia-reperfusion injury during heart attacks and strokes) or during developments and processes in cancer, an apoptotic cell undergoes structural changes including cell shrinkage, plasma membrane blebbing, nuclear condensation, and fragmentation of the DNA and nucleus. This is followed by fragmentation into apoptotic bodies that are quickly removed by phagocytes, thereby preventing an inflammatory response. It is a mode of cell death defined by characteristic morphological, biochemical and molecular changes. It was first described as a "shrinkage necrosis", and then this term was replaced by apoptosis to emphasize its role opposite mitosis in tissue kinetics. In later stages of apoptosis the entire cell becomes fragmented, forming a number of plasma membrane-bounded apoptotic bodies which contain nuclear and or cytoplasmic elements. The ultrastructural appearance of necrosis is quite different, the main features being mitochondrial swelling, plasma membrane breakdown and cellular disintegration. Apoptosis occurs in many physiological and pathological processes. It plays an important role during embryonal development as programmed cell death and accompanies a variety of normal involutional processes in which it serves as a mechanism to remove "unwanted" cells.

The SLC25A31 gene is important for the coding of the most abundant mitochondrial protein Ancp which represents 10% of the proteins of the inner membrane of bovine heart mitochondria. Ancp is encoded by four different genes: SLC25A4 (also known as ANC1 or ANT1), SLC25A5 (ANC3 or ANT2), SLC25A6 (ANC2 or ANT3) and SLC25A31 (ANC4 or ANT4). Their expression is tissue specific and highly regulated and adapted to particular cellular energetic demand. Indeed, human ANC expression patterns depend on the tissue and cell types, the developmental stage and the status of cell proliferation. Furthermore, expression of the genes is modulated by different transcriptional elements in the promoter regions. Therefore, Ancp emerges as a logical candidate to regulate the cellular dependence on oxidative energy metabolism.

To date, there is no evidence of SLC25A31 gene mutations associated with human disease, though they have been associated with male infertility in mice. In addition, ANT4 overexpression has been observed to protect cancer cells from induced apoptosis by anti-cancer drugs such as lonidamine and staurosporine.

== Interactions ==
- OPA1

== See also ==
- SLC25A31+receptor,+human at the U.S. National Library of Medicine Medical Subject Headings (MeSH)
