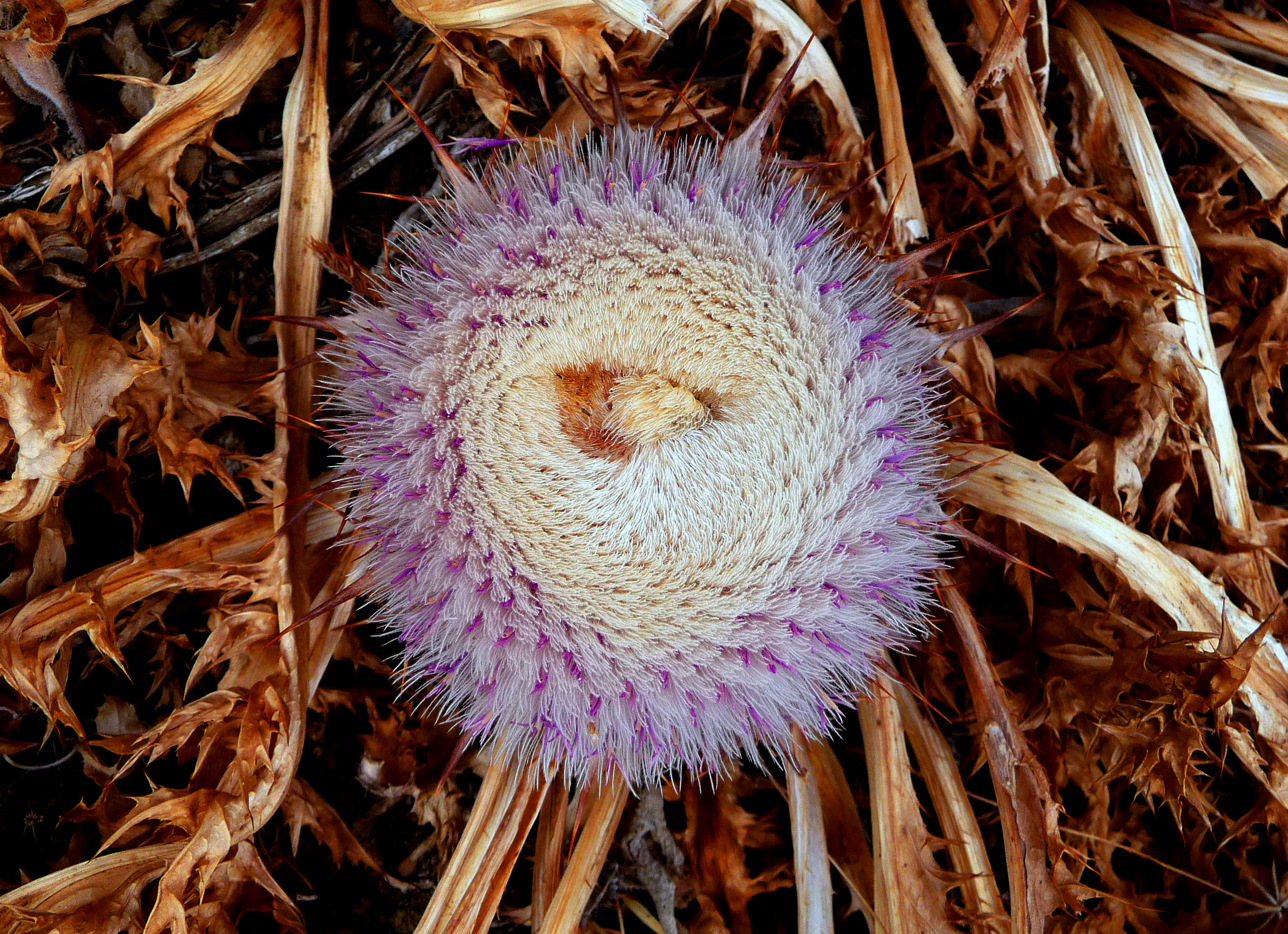
- Chamaeleon gummifer

Scientific classification
- Kingdom: Plantae
- Clade: Tracheophytes
- Clade: Angiosperms
- Clade: Eudicots
- Clade: Asterids
- Order: Asterales
- Family: Asteraceae
- Genus: Chamaeleon; Cass.

Synonyms
- Chamalium Cass.

= Chamaeleon (plant) =

Genus of flowering plants

Chamaeleon is a genus of plants in the Asteraceae family. They are native to an area from the Western Mediterranean to Pakistan.

== Accepted species ==
There are five accepted species in this genus, as of May 2021:

- Chamaeleon comosus (Spreng.) Greuter
- Chamaeleon cuneatus (Boiss.) Dittrich
- Chamaeleon gummifer (L.) Cass.
- Chamaeleon macrocephalus (Moris) Sch.Bip.
- Chamaeleon macrophyllus (Desf.) D.P.Petit
