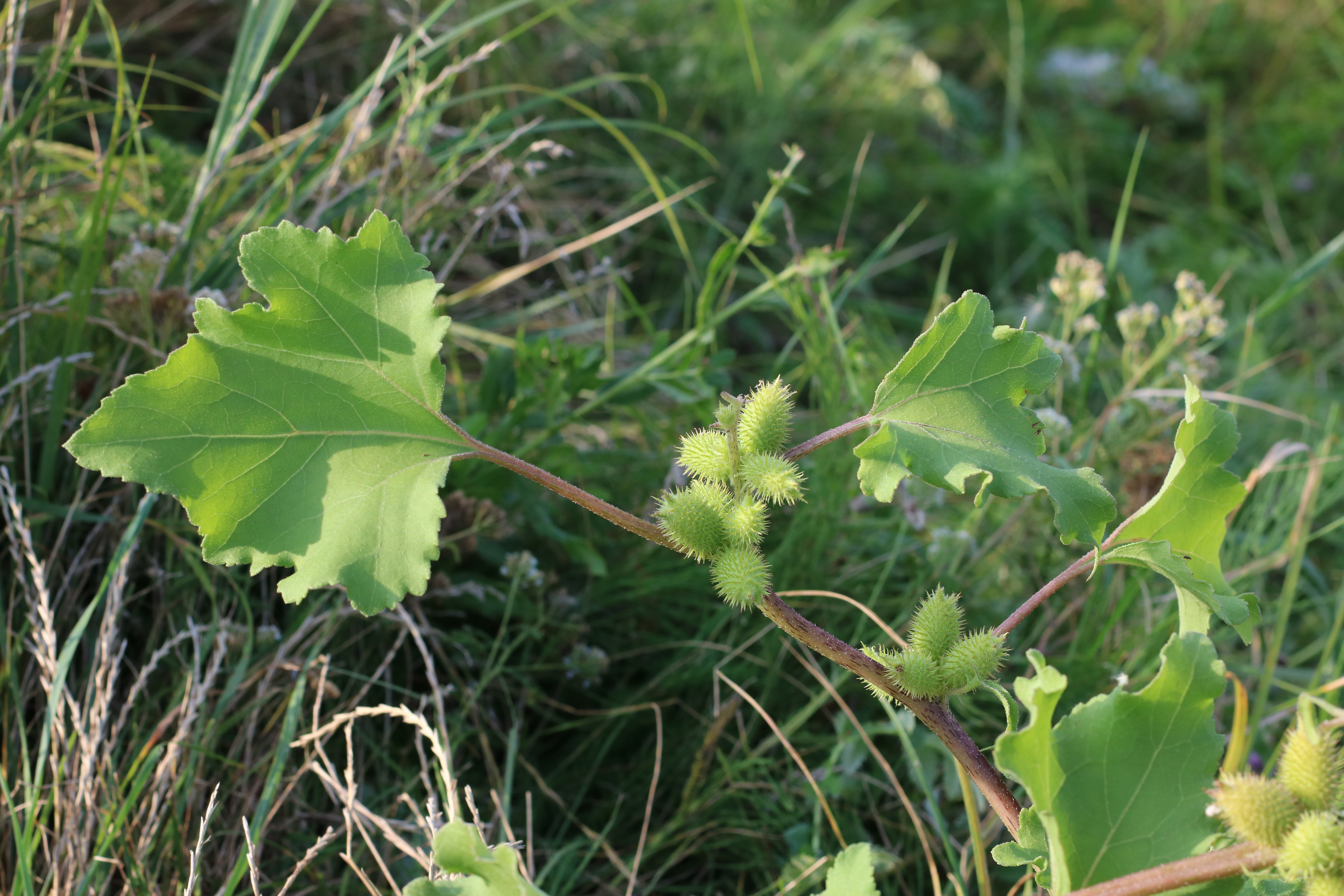
- In Ukraine

Scientific classification
- Kingdom: Plantae
- Clade: Embryophytes
- Clade: Tracheophytes
- Clade: Angiosperms
- Clade: Eudicots
- Clade: Asterids
- Order: Asterales
- Family: Asteraceae
- Tribe: Heliantheae
- Genus: Xanthium
- Species: X. strumarium

Binomial name
- Xanthium strumarium L.

Synonyms
- List: Xanthium abyssinicum Wallr.; Xanthium antiquorum Wallr.; Xanthium arenarium Lasch; Xanthium brasilicum Vell.; Xanthium inaequilaterum DC.; Xanthium indicum J.Koenig ex Roxb.; Xanthium japonicum Widder; Xanthium macrocarpum DC.; Xanthium mongolicum Kitag.; Xanthium natalense Widder; Xanthium pungens var. globuliforme C.Shull; Xanthium sibiricum Patrin ex Widder

= Xanthium strumarium =

Species of flowering plant

Xanthium strumarium (rough cocklebur, Noogoora burr, clotbur, common cocklebur, large cocklebur, woolgarie bur, Siberian cocklebur) is a species of annual plants in the flowering plant family Asteraceae. Some sources claim it originates in southern Europe and Asia, but has been extensively naturalized elsewhere. Others, such as the Flora of China and Flora of North America, state it originates in the Americas but was an early introduction to Eurasia.

== Reproductive biology ==
The species is monoecious, with the flowers borne in separate unisexual heads: staminate (male) heads situated above the pistillate (female) heads in the inflorescence. The pistillate heads consist of two pistillate flowers surrounded by a spiny involucre. Upon fruiting, these two flowers ripen into two brown to black achenes and they are completely enveloped by the involucre, which becomes a bur. The bur, being buoyant, easily disperses in the water for plants growing along waterways. However, the bur, with its hooked projections, is obviously adapted to dispersal via mammals by becoming entangled in their hair. Once dispersed and deposited on the ground, typically one of the seeds germinates and the plants grows out of the bur.

== Toxic or medicinal phytochemistry ==
The plant may have some medicinal properties and has been used in traditional medicine in South Asia and traditional Chinese medicine. In Telugu, this plant is called Marula Matangi.

However, while small quantities of parts of the mature plants may be consumed, the seeds and seedlings should not be eaten in large quantities because they contain significant concentrations of the extremely toxic chemical carboxyatractyloside. The mature plant also contains at least four other toxins.

- Animals have also been known to die after eating the plants.
- A patient consuming a traditional Chinese medicine containing cocklebur called Cang Er Zi Wan (苍耳子丸) developed muscle spasms.
- It was responsible for at least 19 deaths and 76 illnesses in Sylhet District, Bangladesh, 2007. People ate large amounts of the plants, locally called ghagra shak, because they were starving during a monsoon flood and no other plants were available. The symptoms included vomiting and altered mental states, followed by unconsciousness.

== Gallery ==
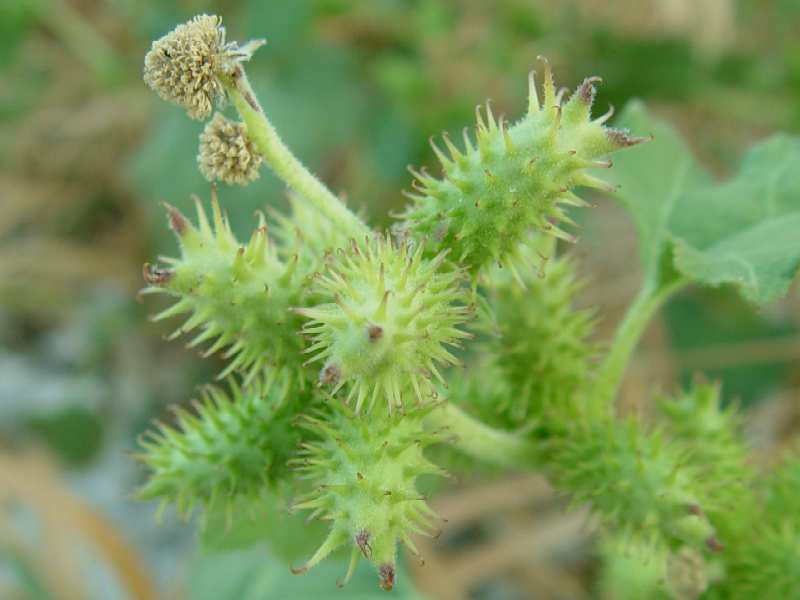
Fruit

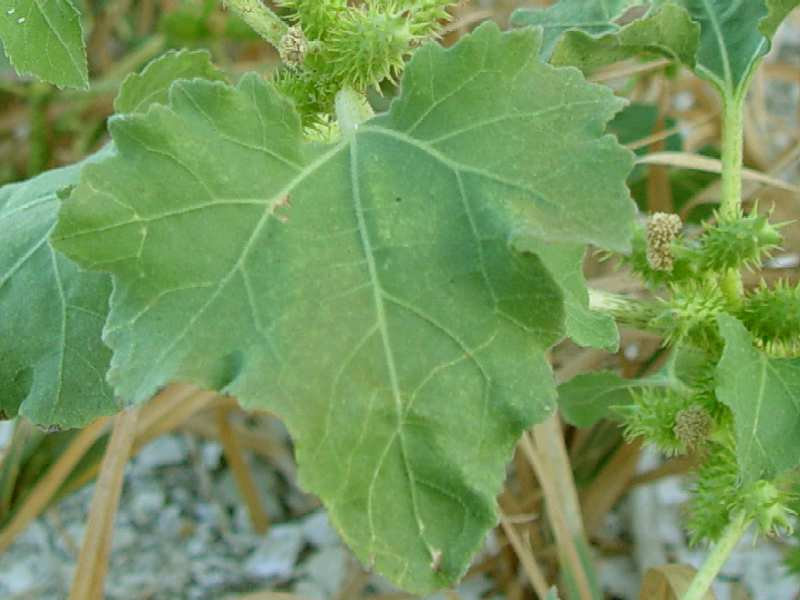
Leaves

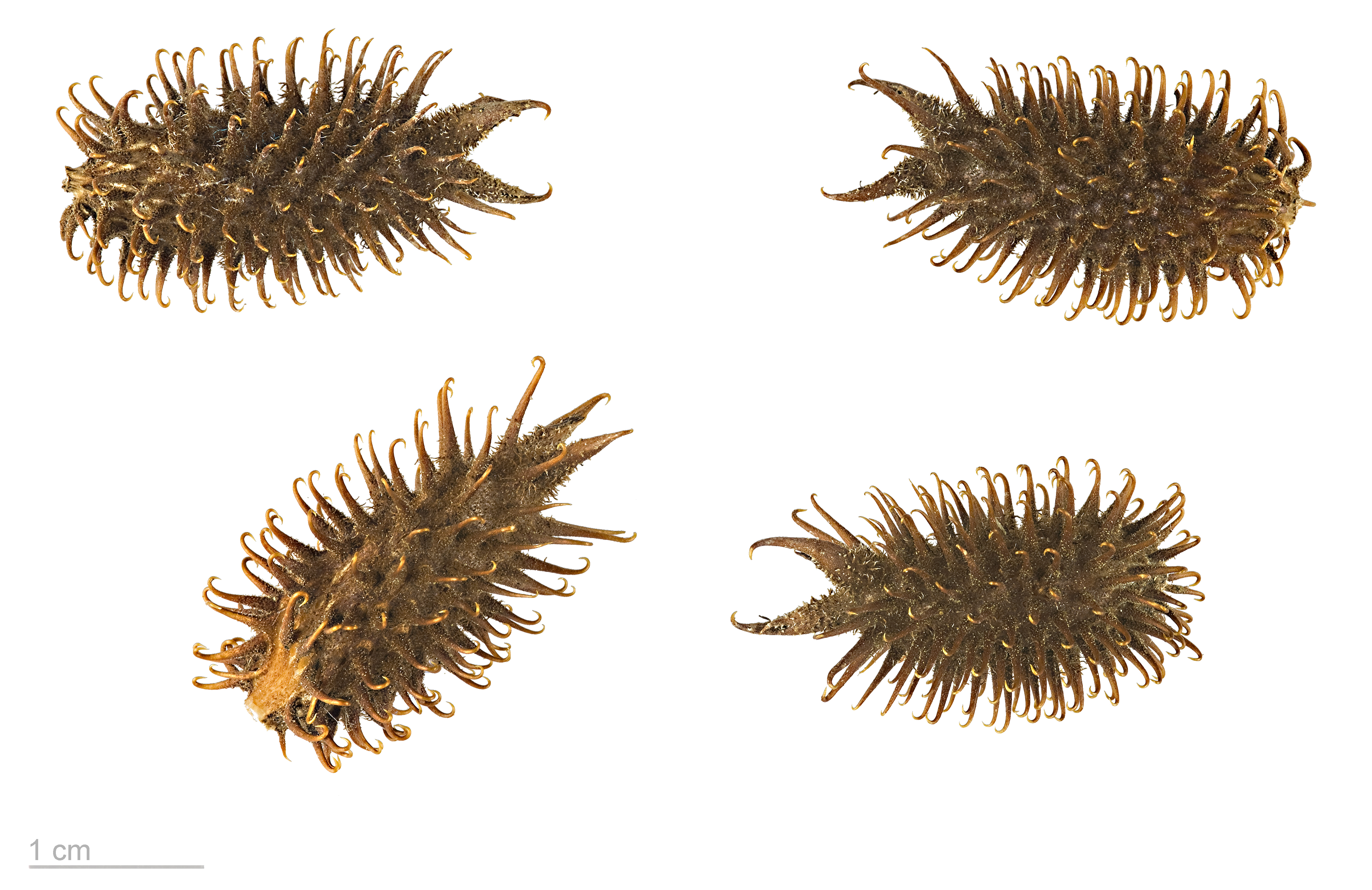
Xanthium strumarium – MHNT

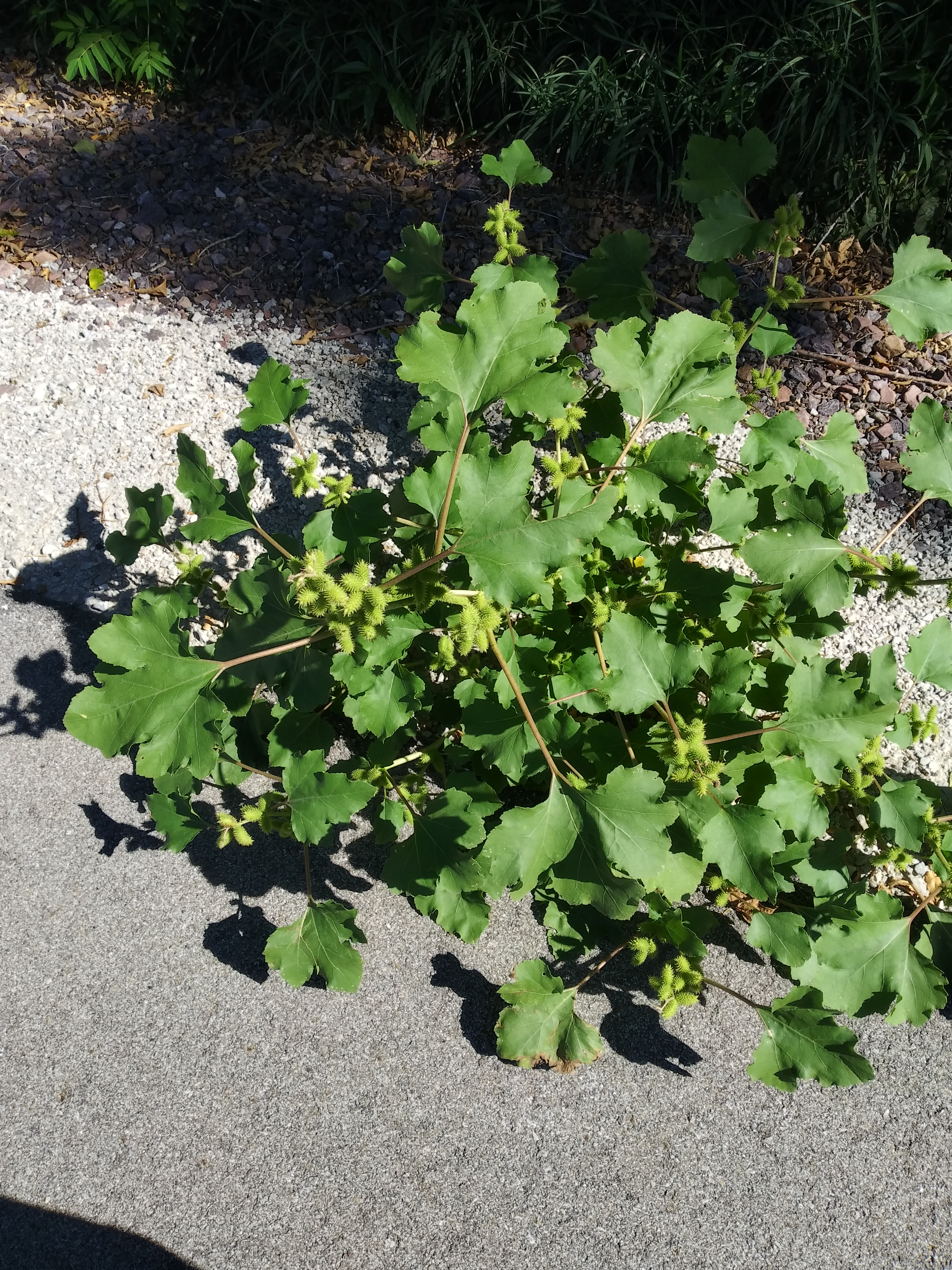
Specimen growing on a Midwest Bike Trail

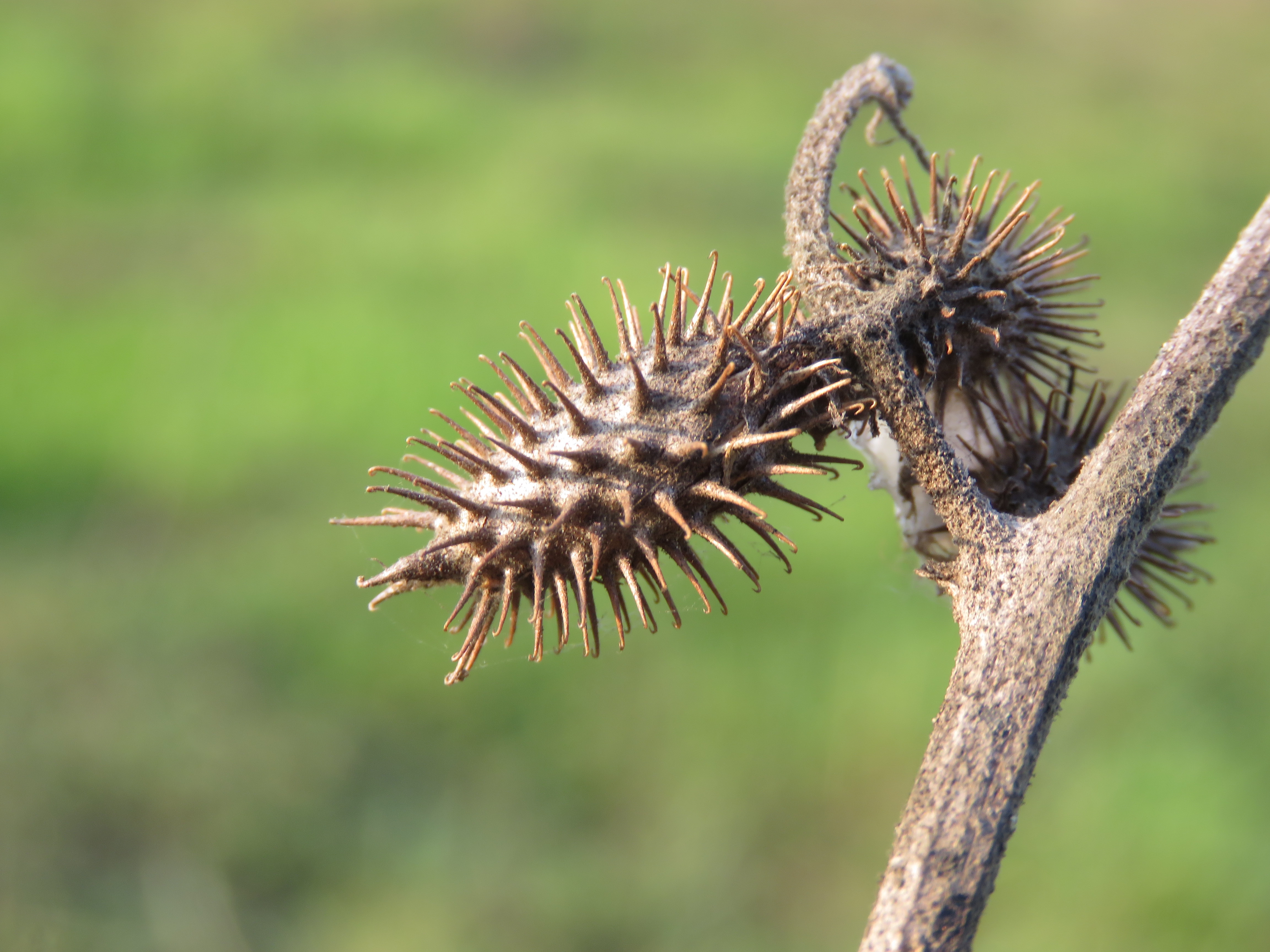

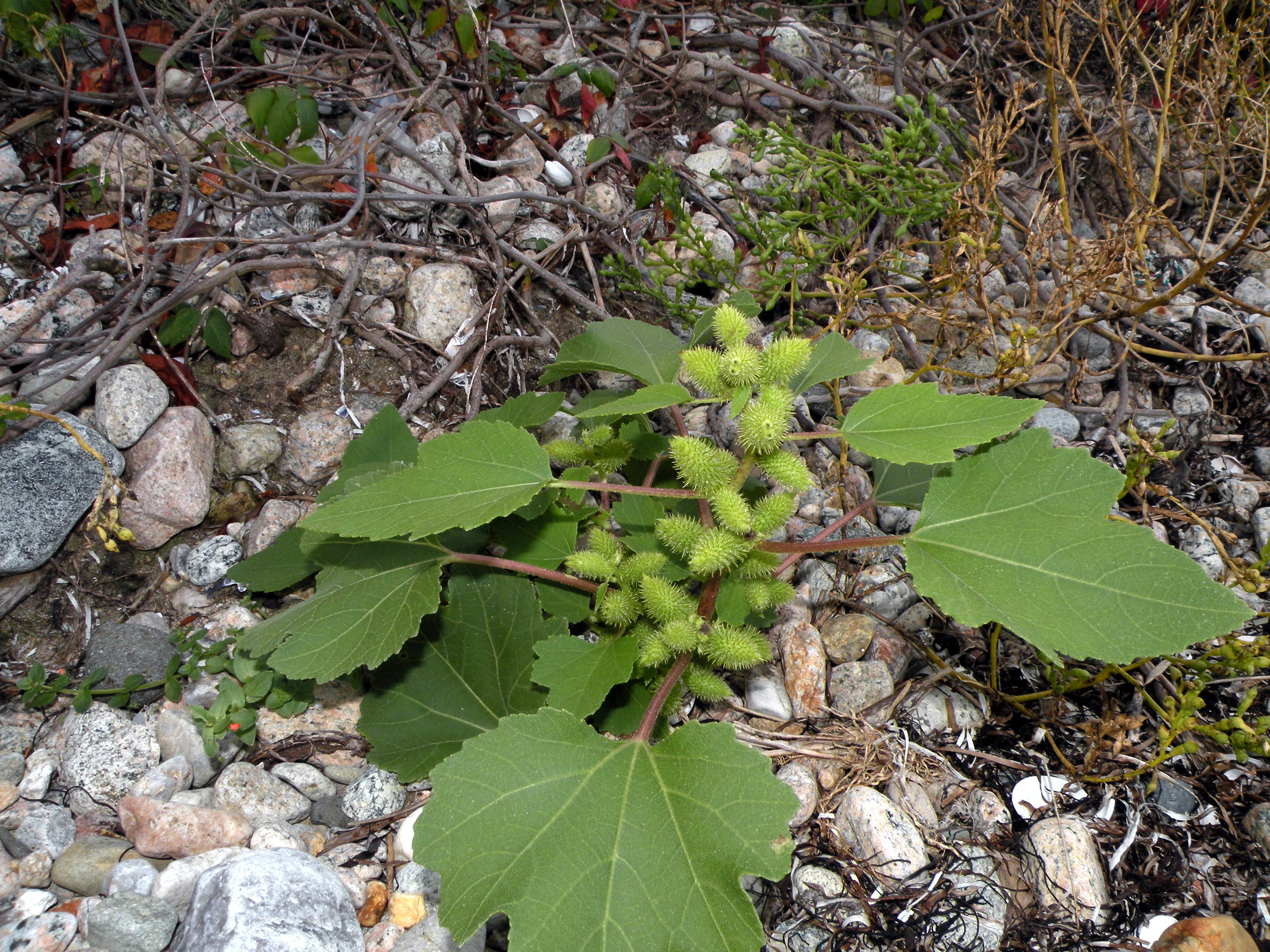

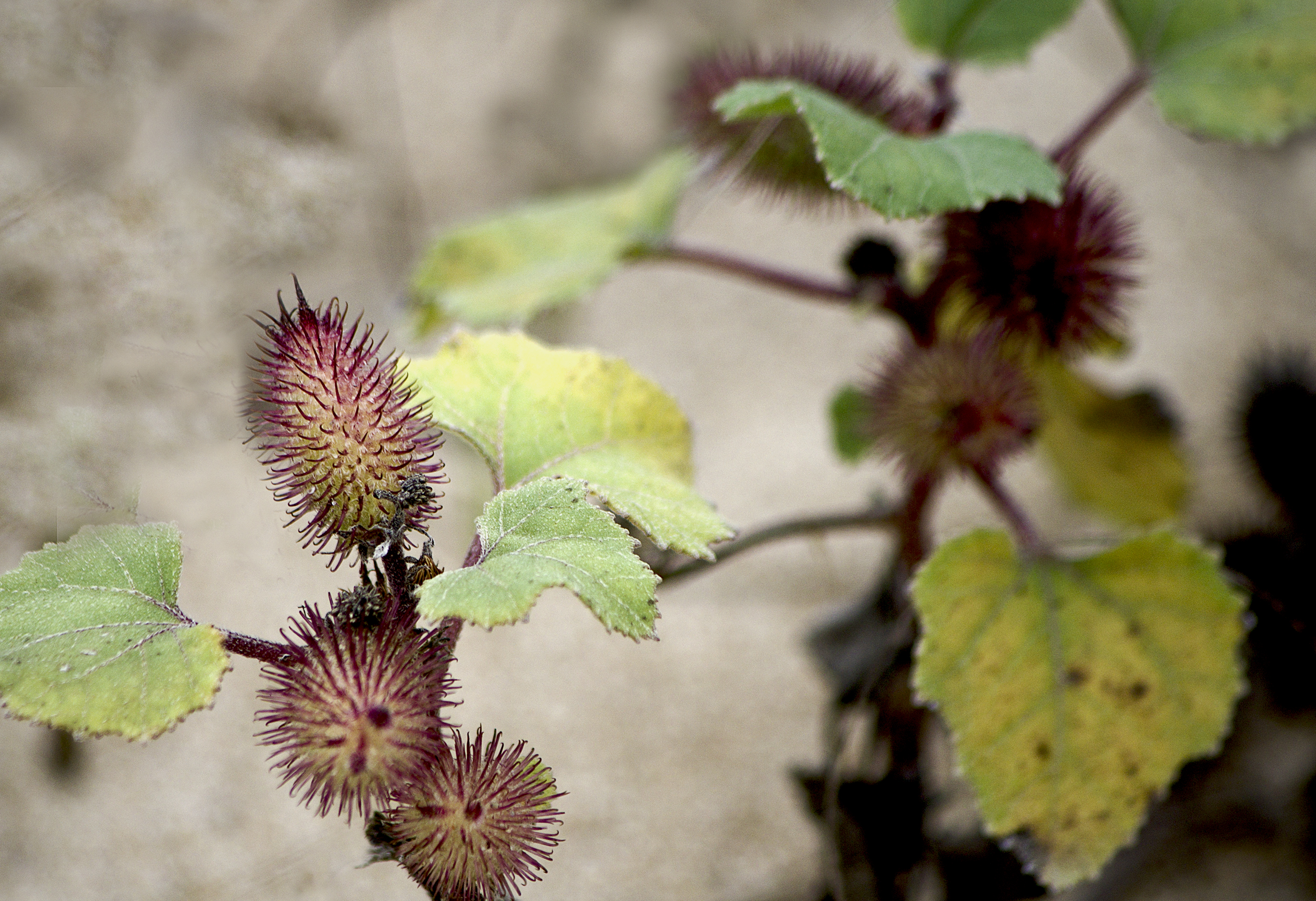

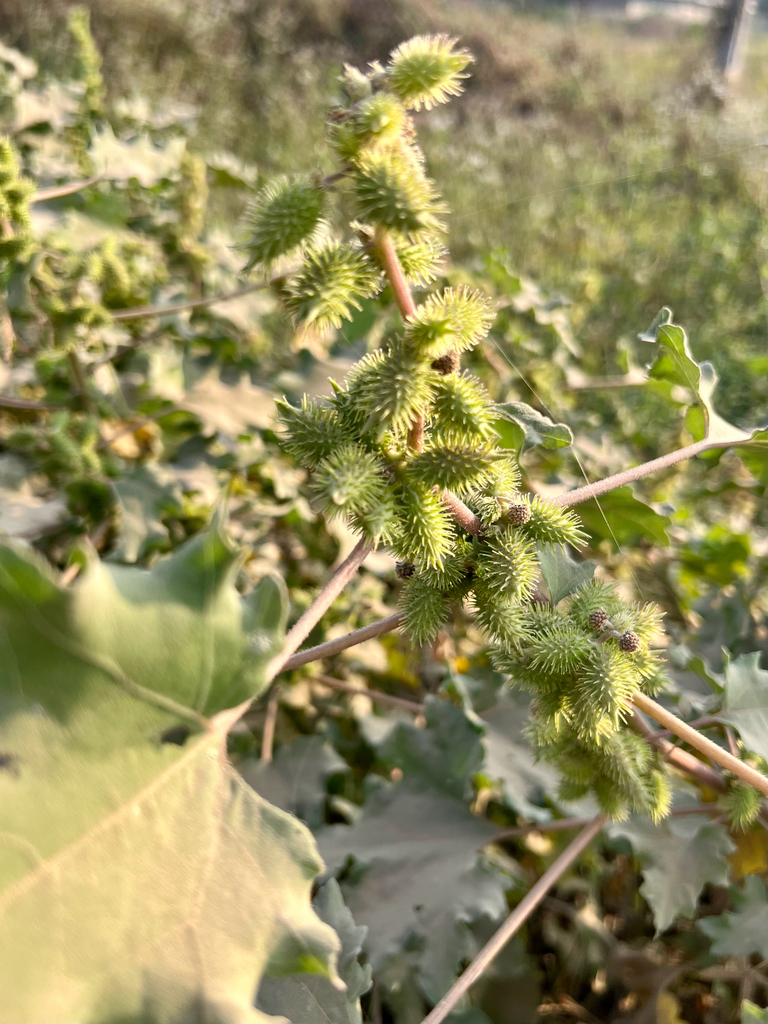

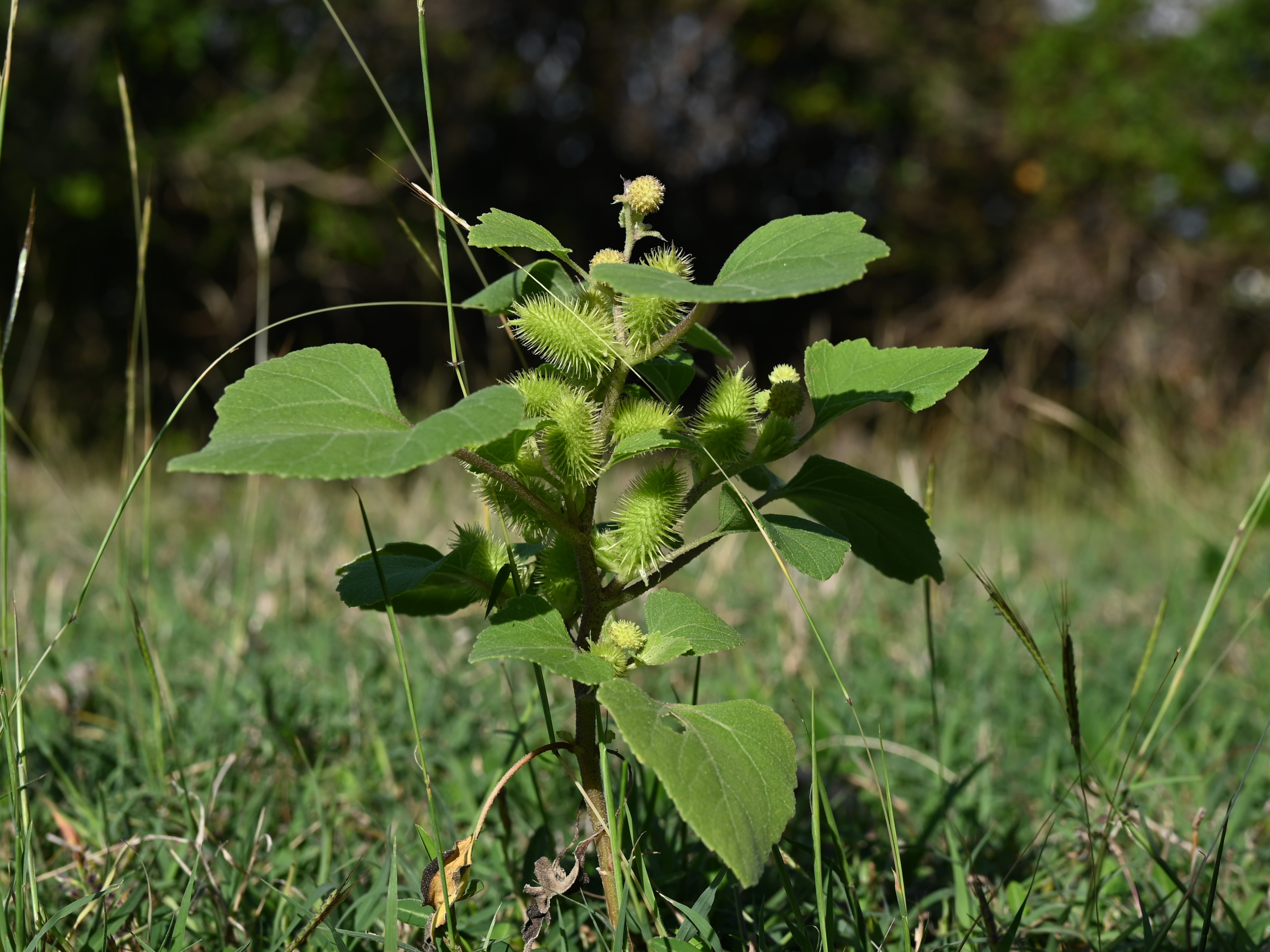

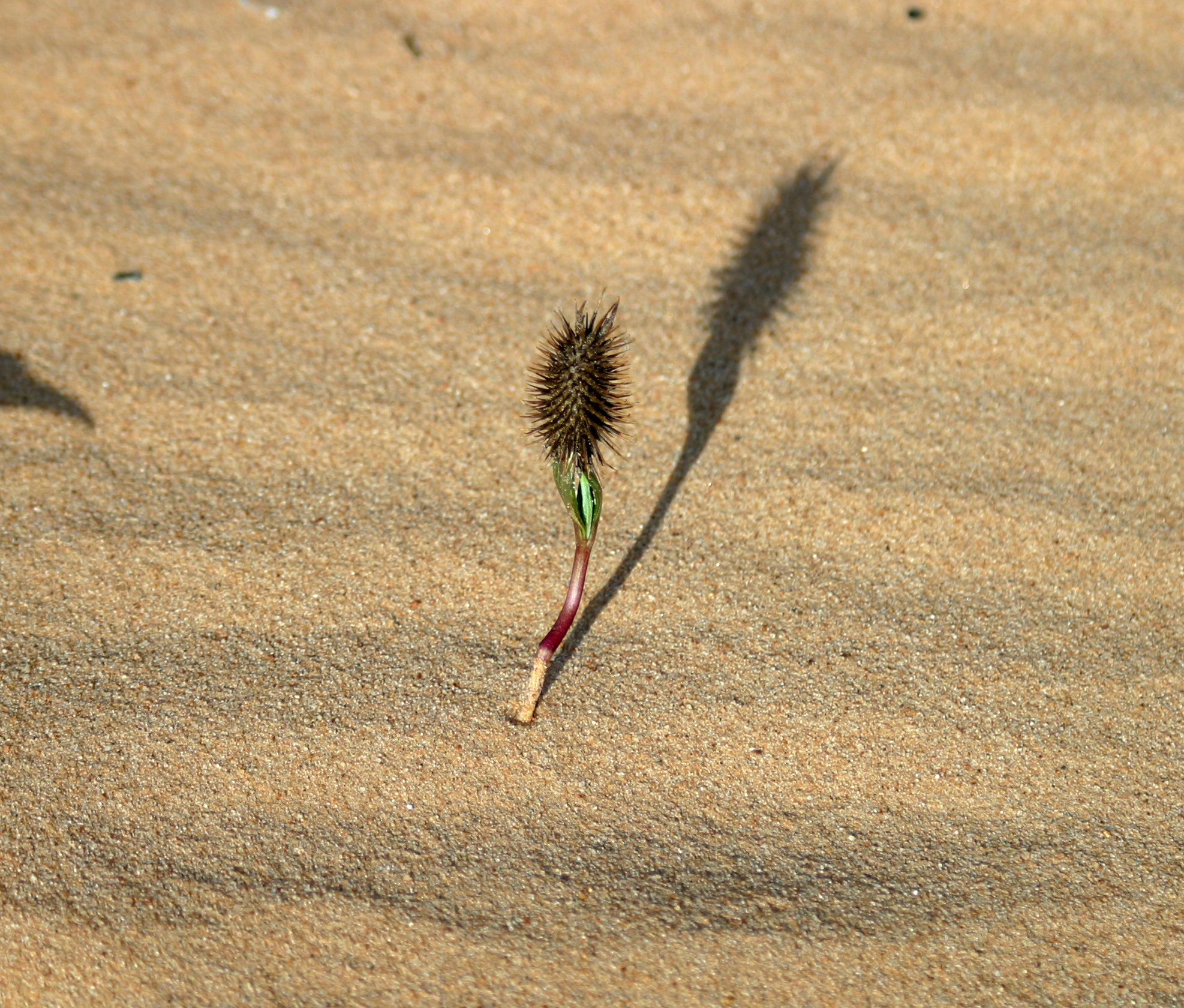
Seedling in West Texas

== See also ==
- Arctium
