= MMS19 =

Protein-coding gene in the species Homo sapiens

Identifiers
- Aliases: MMS19, MET18, MMS19L, hMMS19 homolog, cytosolic iron-sulfur assembly component, CIAO4
- External IDs: OMIM: 614777; MGI: 1919449; GeneCards: MMS19

Gene location (Human)
Chr.	Chromosome 10 (human)
Band	10q24.1	Start	97,458,324 bp
Band	10q24.1	End	97,498,794 bp

Gene location (Mouse)
Chr.	Chromosome 19 (mouse)
Band	19|19 C3	Start	41,929,525 bp
Band	19|19 C3	End	41,969,596 bp
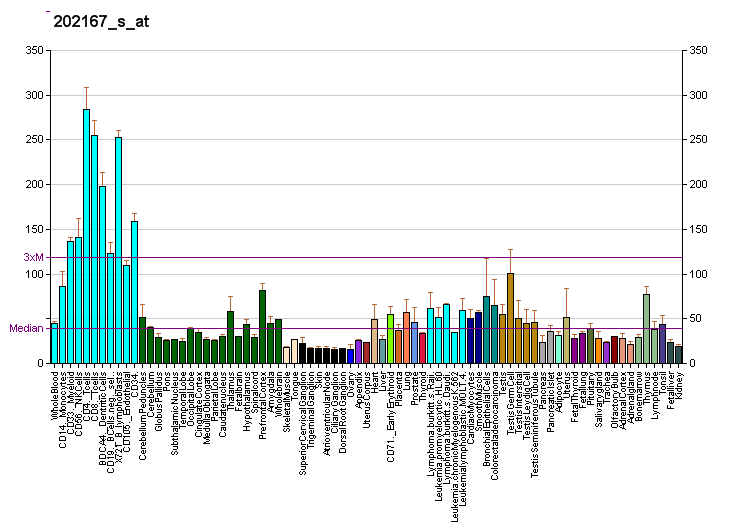
RNA expression pattern
Bgee	Human / Mouse (ortholog); Top expressed in: right hemisphere of cerebellum; anterior pituitary; skin of leg; right testis; skin of abdomen; left testis; tibial nerve; apex of heart; right ovary; ventricular zone / Top expressed in: tail of embryo; neural layer of retina; genital tubercle; muscle of thigh; granulocyte; ventricular zone; superior frontal gyrus; thymus; lip; oocyte; More reference expression data
BioGPS	More reference expression data
Gene ontology
Molecular function	protein-macromolecule adaptor activity; transcription coactivator activity; protein binding; enzyme binding; signaling receptor complex adaptor activity; estrogen receptor binding
Cellular component	membrane; nucleoplasm; transcription factor TFIIH holo complex; CIA complex; cytoskeleton; MMXD complex; nucleus; cytoplasm; spindle; cytosol
Biological process	regulation of transcription, DNA-templated; chromosome segregation; DNA metabolic process; cellular response to DNA damage stimulus; positive regulation of transcription, DNA-templated; iron-sulfur cluster assembly; phosphorelay signal transduction system; response to hormone; DNA repair; nucleotide-excision repair; transcription, DNA-templated; protein maturation by iron-sulfur cluster transfer; positive regulation of double-strand break repair via homologous recombination; positive regulation of signal transduction
Sources:Amigo / QuickGO
Orthologs
Databases	NCBI: entry; OMA: entry
Species	Human	Mouse
Entrez	64210	72199
Ensembl	ENSG00000155229	ENSMUSG00000025159
UniProt	Q96T76	Q9D071
RefSeq (mRNA)	NM_001289403; NM_001289404; NM_001289405; NM_022362; NM_001330128 NM_001351356; NM_001351357; NM_001351358; NM_001351359	NM_028152; NM_001373946
RefSeq (protein)	NP_001276332; NP_001276333; NP_001276334; NP_001317057; NP_071757 NP_001338285; NP_001338286; NP_001338287; NP_001338288	NP_082428; NP_001360875
Location (UCSC)	Chr 10: 97.46 – 97.5 Mb	Chr 19: 41.93 – 41.97 Mb
PubMed search
- Wikidata
View/Edit Human	View/Edit Mouse

MMS19 nucleotide excision repair protein homolog is a protein that in humans is encoded by the MMS19 gene.
