= Chameleon (computing) =

Chameleon is a computer workstation design produced at ETH Zurich running the Oberon operating system.

The Seequa Chameleon was also an older luggable computer from the early 1980s, distinguished by being able to run both the MS-DOS and CP/M-80 operating systems.
