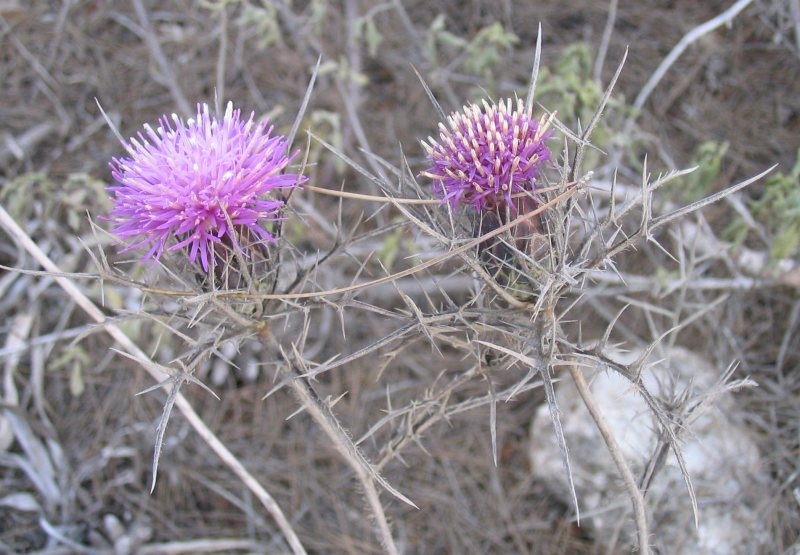
- Atractylis comosa

Scientific classification
- Kingdom: Plantae
- Clade: Embryophytes
- Clade: Tracheophytes
- Clade: Spermatophytes
- Clade: Angiosperms
- Clade: Eudicots
- Clade: Asterids
- Order: Asterales
- Family: Asteraceae
- Subfamily: Carduoideae
- Tribe: Cardueae
- Subtribe: Carlininae
- Genus: Atractylis; L. 1753 not Boehm. 1760.

Synonyms
- Spadactis Cass.; Atractylis sect. Anactis (Cass.) DC.; Acarna All.; Crocodilina Bubani; Anactis Cass.; Cirsellium Gaertn.

= Atractylis =

Genus of flowering plants

Atractylis is a genus of flowering plants in the family Asteraceae.

Species

Atractylis is native to the greater Mediterranean region (southern Europe, the Middle East, North Africa, and the Canary Islands).

- Atractylis arabica Rech.f.
- Atractylis arbuscula Svent. & Michaelis
- Atractylis aristata Batt.
- Atractylis auranitica Rech.f.
- Atractylis babelii Hochr.
- Atractylis boulosii Täckh.
- Atractylis caerulea Batt.
- Atractylis caespitosa Desf.
- Atractylis cancellata L.
- Atractylis carduus (Forssk.) C.Chr.
- Atractylis ciliaris L.
- Atractylis cryptocephala (Baker) F.G.Davies
- Atractylis delicatula Batt. ex L.Chevall.
- Atractylis delvarii Mozaff.
- Atractylis echinata Pomel
- Atractylis echinops Pall.
- Atractylis humilis L.
- Atractylis kentrophylloides (Baker) F.G.Davies
- Atractylis mernephthae Asch., Schweinf. & Letourn.
- Atractylis mutica C.C.Towns.
- Atractylis phaeolepis Pomel
- Atractylis phazaniae Corti
- Atractylis polycephala Coss.
- Atractylis preauxiana Sch.Bip.
- Atractylis prolifera Boiss.
- Atractylis scabra Boiss.
- Atractylis serrata Pomel
- Atractylis serratuloides (Cass.) DC.
- Atractylis sojakii Rech.f.
- Atractylis spinosa L.
- Atractylis tutinii Franco
