= Metis (American musician) =

Jihan Bowes-Little
- Born: San Francisco, California, U.S.
- Origin: Bay Area, California, U.S.
- Genres: Hip hop; Spoken word
- Occupations: Musician; Spoken word artist; Former basketball player; Investment banker; Venture capitalist
- Instrument: Vocals
- Years active: 2007–present
- Label: Zagazow Records

Jihan Bowes-Little, who performs under the stage name Metis, is a hip hop and spoken word artist originally from Northern California's Bay Area.

== Biography ==
Bowes-Little grew up in San Francisco. He gained a scholarship to Brown University in Providence, Rhode Island where he studied philosophy and economics, and later studied at the London School of Economics.

Bowes-Little's first career was as a professional basketball player, after which he worked as a trader for investment banks in New York City and London, including the position of vice president, credit trading at Goldman Sachs, while pursuing a second career as a hip hop artist and poet in the evenings since 2007 under the name Metis (a reference to the Greek language, which he describes as "perceiving the true essence of things").

He left Goldman Sachs in January 2009 to concentrate on his music and book and film projects. His debut album, The Path, produced with members of M People, and with contributions from Busy Signal, Demarco, 88-Keys, K-Salaam, Dilated Peoples, and Soul Diggaz, released in 2010. In late 2009, Metis won four awards at the Exposure Music Awards East ceremony in Cambridge, in the categories Best Male Artist, Best Live!, Best Urban Song ("Hustlin"), and Best Alternative Song ("All In").

He has written an autobiography, The Trade, which has been picked up by a literary agent and with which he has tried to interest Hollywood directors with a view to turning it into a film.

He went back into mainstream finance with a portfolio manager role at Bluecrest Capital Management in January 2012.

In 2016, he shifted again, joining J.P. Morgan’s private bank in March. After 18 months he became the founder and managing partner at Bracket VC.

He lives in Los Angeles with his wife and two children.

== Music ==
1st Mixtape The Atlas Mixtape hosted by DJ WhooKid with tracks "Don't Go There" w/ BOB (Atlantic), "I Am Me" w/ Joel Ortiz.

2nd Mixtape The Roark Mixtape again hosted by WhooKid, with track "The March" ft Skyzoo, for which Metis also shot a video. Both mixtapes received substantial coverage across most major hip-hop blogs including early supporter DJBOOTH.NET, as well as hiphopdx.com and many others.

In 2011 Metis' pre-single Champion was selected to front the 2011 ESPN Images of the Year commercial, played on SportsCenter across America throughout December and January 2011. The track was self released on iTunes "" - ""

In 2012 Metis track "All In" (ft Aynzli Jones) was selected by Coke Zero to front two global television campaigns. The first, "Liquid" to begin airing fall of 2012. The second, larger, campaign "A Step From Zero" to begin airing in early 2013.

The "A Step From Zero" extended cut received over 2mm views in its first 2 months online.

Metis debut album The Path released in 2010 was produced with Jahlil Beats, Printz Board, !llmind, Mark Knight and James Reynolds.

Metis is published by Zagazow Records, run by former President of VP Records and Greensleeves Publishing, Olivier Chastan.

Metis is self-managed. He also manages the singer Aynzli Jones and producer RedSkull Beats.

== Book ==
Jihan/Metis has completed a novel based on his experiences as a proprietary trader / rising hip-hop artist entitled 'The Trade'. The book is represented by Charlie Campbell at Ed Victor Agency & Co.
