= ADP/ATP translocase 3 =

Protein found in humans

SLC25A6

Identifiers
- Aliases: SLC25A6, ADP/ATP translocase 3, solute carrier family 25 member 6, AAC3, ANT 2, ANT 3, ANT3, ANT3Y, ANT
- External IDs: OMIM: 300151, 403000; GeneCards: SLC25A6

Gene location (Human)
Chr.	X chromosome (human)
Band	X;Y	Start	1,386,152 bp
Band	X;Y	End	1,392,113 bp
RNA expression pattern
Bgee	Human / Mouse (ortholog); Top expressed in: cartilage tissue; renal medulla; nipple; left ovary; embryo; pylorus; vulva; body of stomach; right ovary; ganglionic eminence / n/a; More reference expression data
BioGPS	n/a
Gene ontology
Molecular function	transporter activity; protein binding; adenine transmembrane transporter activity; ATP:ADP antiporter activity; transmembrane transporter activity
Cellular component	membrane; TIM23 mitochondrial import inner membrane translocase complex; mitochondrion; mitochondrial inner membrane; nucleus; extracellular matrix; integral component of membrane
Biological process	regulation of insulin secretion; protein targeting to mitochondrion; transmembrane transport; apoptotic process; ADP transport; ATP transport; viral process; adenine transport; regulation of mitochondrial membrane permeability; transport
Sources:Amigo / QuickGO
Orthologs
Databases	NCBI: entry; OMA: entry
Species	Human	Mouse
Entrez	293	n/a
Ensembl	ENSG00000169100	n/a
UniProt	P12236; Q6I9V5	n/a
RefSeq (mRNA)	NM_001636	n/a
RefSeq (protein)	NP_001627; NP_001627.2	n/a
Location (UCSC)	Chr X: 1.39 – 1.39 Mb	n/a
PubMed search		n/a
- Wikidata
View/Edit Human

ADP/ATP translocase 3, also known as solute carrier family 25 member 6, is a protein that in humans is encoded by the SLC25A6 gene.

Identical copies of this gene reside on the pseudoautosomal regions of the X and Y chromosomes.

== See also ==
- Adenine nucleotide translocator
- Solute carrier family
