= ADP/ATP translocase 2 =

Protein-coding gene in humans

SLC25A5

Identifiers
- Aliases: SLC25A5, 2F1, AAC2, ANT2, T2, T3, solute carrier family 25 member 5
- External IDs: OMIM: 300150; MGI: 1353496; GeneCards: SLC25A5

Gene location (Human)
Chr.	X chromosome (human)
Band	Xq24	Start	119,468,422 bp
Band	Xq24	End	119,471,396 bp

Gene location (Mouse)
Chr.	X chromosome (mouse)
Band	X A3.3|X 21.2 cM	Start	36,059,304 bp
Band	X A3.3|X 21.2 cM	End	36,062,460 bp
RNA expression pattern
Bgee	Human / Mouse (ortholog); Top expressed in: renal medulla; jejunal mucosa; mucosa of ileum; mucosa of pharynx; thymus; mucosa of transverse colon; duodenum; mucosa of sigmoid colon; vulva; human penis / Top expressed in: hair follicle; right kidney; epithelium of stomach; left colon; primitive streak; blastocyst; Epithelium of choroid plexus; jejunum; atrioventricular valve; migratory enteric neural crest cell; More reference expression data
BioGPS	n/a
Gene ontology
Molecular function	transporter activity; protein binding; adenine transmembrane transporter activity; ubiquitin protein ligase binding; RNA binding; ATP:ADP antiporter activity; transmembrane transporter activity
Cellular component	integral component of membrane; membrane; myelin sheath; integral component of plasma membrane; mitochondrion; mitochondrial nucleoid; extracellular exosome; nucleus; MMXD complex; extracellular matrix; mitochondrial inner membrane; membrane raft
Biological process	regulation of insulin secretion; chromosome segregation; negative regulation of mitochondrial outer membrane permeabilization involved in apoptotic signaling pathway; transmembrane transport; positive regulation of cell population proliferation; viral process; adenine transport; ADP transport; ATP transport; cellular response to leukemia inhibitory factor; transport
Sources:Amigo / QuickGO
Orthologs
Databases	NCBI: entry; OMA: entry
Species	Human	Mouse
Entrez	292	11740
Ensembl	ENSG00000005022	ENSMUSG00000016319
UniProt	P05141; Q6NVC0	P51881
RefSeq (mRNA)	NM_001152	NM_007451
RefSeq (protein)	NP_001143; NP_001143.2	NP_031477
Location (UCSC)	Chr X: 119.47 – 119.47 Mb	Chr X: 36.06 – 36.06 Mb
PubMed search
- Wikidata
View/Edit Human	View/Edit Mouse

ADP/ATP translocase 2 is a protein that in humans is encoded by the SLC25A5 gene on the X chromosome.

This protein functions as an antiporter for ADP/ATP exchange between the mitochondrial matrix and cytoplasm. As a result, it plays a key role in maintaining mitochondrial membrane potential and inhibiting apoptosis and has been targeted for treating cancer.

== Structure ==
The SLC25A5 gene belongs to the ANT gene family, which itself belongs to the superfamily that includes genes encoding brown fat mitochondrial uncoupling proteins and mitochondrial phosphate carrier proteins. Compared to the other gene isoforms, SLC25A5 possesses different motifs, including a CCACT sequence rather than the canonical CCAAT sequence upstream of the TATA box, as well as five SP1 binding sites. This gene consists of 4 exons, while its encoded protein forms a homodimer embedded in the inner mitochondrial membrane. The entire protein is composed of 300-320 amino acid residues folded into six transmembrane helices. The human genome contains four differentially expressed isoforms, as well as several non-transcribed pseudogenes, of this gene.

== Function ==
This gene is a member of the mitochondrial carrier subfamily of solute carrier protein genes. The product of this gene, adenine nucleotide translocator 2 (ANT2), functions as a major constituent of the mitochondrial permeability-transition pore complex that catalyzes the exchange of mitochondrial ATP with cytosolic ADP. As a result of its antiporter function, ANT2 maintains mitochondrial membrane potential by regulating ADP/ATP ratios in oxidative phosphorylation. ANT2 facilitates uncoupling of the mitochondrial membrane when acylated by SIRT4. Though uncoupling the membrane potential typically leads to apoptosis, ANT2 was found to be antiapoptotic. As a result, it is postulated to mediate the TFIIH-dependent response to DNA damage as a component of the MMS19-XPD. Alternatively, suppressing the expression of this gene has been shown to induce apoptosis and inhibit tumor growth.

Though ANT2 is highly conserved and ubiquitously expressed, its expression levels and, accordingly, biological function, may vary depending on tissue type. It is specifically expressed in undifferentiated cells and renewable tissues while maintaining low expression levels in differentiated cells. Due to its expression profile, it has been used as a growth marker and targeted for studies in tumor cell growth.

== Clinical Significance ==
The SLC25A5 enzyme is an important constituent in apoptotic signaling and oxidative stress, most notably as part of the mitochondrial death pathway and cardiac myocyte apoptosis signaling. Programmed cell death is a distinct genetic and biochemical pathway essential to metazoans. An intact death pathway is required for successful embryonic development and the maintenance of normal tissue homeostasis. Apoptosis has proven to be tightly interwoven with other essential cell pathways. The identification of critical control points in the cell death pathway has yielded fundamental insights for basic biology, as well as provided rational targets for new therapeutics a normal embryologic processes, or during cell injury (such as ischemia-reperfusion injury during heart attacks and strokes) or during developments and processes in cancer, an apoptotic cell undergoes structural changes including cell shrinkage, plasma membrane blebbing, nuclear condensation, and fragmentation of the DNA and nucleus. This is followed by fragmentation into apoptotic bodies that are quickly removed by phagocytes, thereby preventing an inflammatory response. It is a mode of cell death defined by characteristic morphological, biochemical and molecular changes. It was first described as a "shrinkage necrosis", and then this term was replaced by apoptosis to emphasize its role opposite mitosis in tissue kinetics. In later stages of apoptosis the entire cell becomes fragmented, forming a number of plasma membrane-bounded apoptotic bodies which contain nuclear and or cytoplasmic elements. The ultrastructural appearance of necrosis is quite different, the main features being mitochondrial swelling, plasma membrane breakdown and cellular disintegration. Apoptosis occurs in many physiological and pathological processes. It plays an important role during embryonal development as programmed cell death and accompanies a variety of normal involutional processes in which it serves as a mechanism to remove "unwanted" cells.

The SLC25A5 gene is important for the coding of the most abundant mitochondrial protein Ancp which represents 10% of the proteins of the inner membrane of bovine heart mitochondria. Ancp is encoded by four different genes: SLC25A4 (also known as ANC1 or ANT1), SLC25A5 (ANC3 or ANT2), SLC25A6 (ANC2 or ANT3) and SLC25A31 (ANC4 or ANT4). Their expression is tissue specific and highly regulated and adapted to particular cellular energetic demand. Indeed, human ANC expression patterns depend on the tissue and cell types, the developmental stage and the status of cell proliferation. Furthermore, expression of the genes is modulated by different transcriptional elements in the promoter regions. Therefore, Ancp emerges as a logical candidate to regulate the cellular dependence on oxidative energy metabolism.

Overexpression of ANT2 has been linked to tumor cell growth and attributed to its anti-apoptotic function. One study found that specific silencing of the ANT2 gene failed to induce apoptosis to tumor cells without a combining treatment with lonidamine, an anti-tumor drug, thus indicating that additional factors may be involved to mediate membrane permeability and programmed cell death. According to a study by Oishi et al., knockdown of ANT2 upregulated DR5, resulting in Apo2L/TRAIL-induced apoptosis. Moreover, studies by Ji-Young Jang et al. confirmed the effectiveness of silencing ANT2 in breast cancer and hepatocellular carcinoma using small hairpin RNAs (shRNA). Thus, ANT2 inhibitors could contribute to anticancer therapies.

In the brain, ANT2 participates as part of the post-synaptic density (PSD) and, thus, has been associated with X-linked intellectual disability (XLID).

== Interactions ==
SLC25A5 has been shown to interact with:

- SIRT4
