= ADP/ATP translocase 1 =

Protein found in humans

SLC25A4
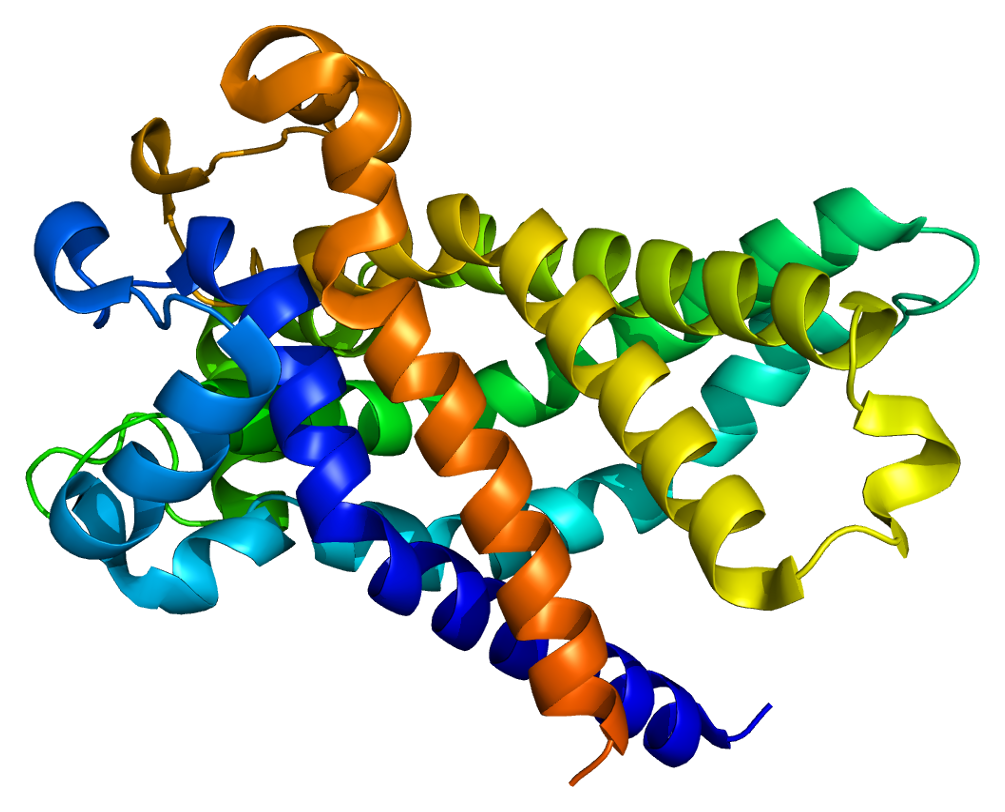

Identifiers
- Aliases: SLC25A4, AAC1, ANT, ANT 1, ANT1, MTDPS12, PEO2, PEO3, T1, PEOA2, solute carrier family 25 member 4, MTDPS12A
- External IDs: OMIM: 103220; MGI: 1353495; GeneCards: SLC25A4

Gene location (Human)
Chr.	Chromosome 4 (human)
Band	4q35.1	Start	185,143,266 bp
Band	4q35.1	End	185,150,382 bp

Gene location (Mouse)
Chr.	Chromosome 8 (mouse)
Band	8 B1.1|8 26.22 cM	Start	46,659,834 bp
Band	8 B1.1|8 26.22 cM	End	46,664,321 bp
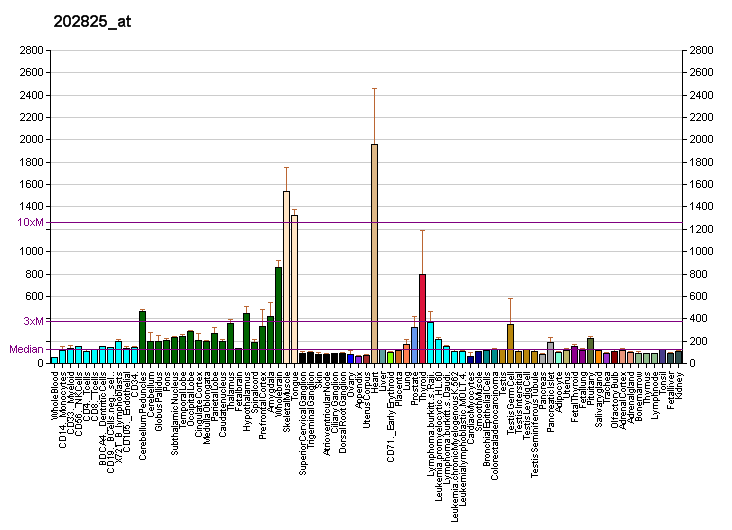
RNA expression pattern
Bgee	Human / Mouse (ortholog); Top expressed in: myocardium of left ventricle; right ventricle; apex of heart; cardiac muscle tissue of right atrium; body of tongue; triceps brachii muscle; vastus lateralis muscle; thoracic diaphragm; right auricle of heart; Skeletal muscle tissue of rectus abdominis / Top expressed in: atrioventricular valve; endocardial cushion; atrium; myocardium of ventricle; cardiac muscles; gastrocnemius muscle; plantaris muscle; extensor digitorum longus muscle; interventricular septum; right ventricle; More reference expression data
BioGPS	More reference expression data
Gene ontology
Molecular function	transporter activity; protein binding; adenine transmembrane transporter activity; ATP:ADP antiporter activity; transmembrane transporter activity
Cellular component	integral component of membrane; membrane; myelin sheath; integral component of plasma membrane; mitochondrion; nucleus; mitochondrial inner membrane; integral component of mitochondrial membrane
Biological process	mitochondrial genome maintenance; regulation of insulin secretion; negative regulation of necroptotic process; generation of precursor metabolites and energy; apoptotic mitochondrial changes; transmembrane transport; viral process; adenine transport; ATP transport; regulation of mitochondrial membrane permeability; ADP transport; transport
Sources:Amigo / QuickGO
Orthologs
Databases	NCBI: entry; OMA: entry
Species	Human	Mouse
Entrez	291	11739
Ensembl	ENSG00000151729	ENSMUSG00000031633
UniProt	P12235	P48962
RefSeq (mRNA)	NM_001151	NM_007450
RefSeq (protein)	NP_001142	NP_031476
Location (UCSC)	Chr 4: 185.14 – 185.15 Mb	Chr 8: 46.66 – 46.66 Mb
PubMed search
- Wikidata
View/Edit Human	View/Edit Mouse

ADP/ATP translocase 1, or adenine nucleotide translocator 1 (ANT1), is an enzyme that in humans is encoded by the SLC25A4 gene.

== Interactions ==
SLC25A4 has been shown to interact with Bcl-2-associated X protein.
