= Oncom =

Indonesian traditional fermented dish

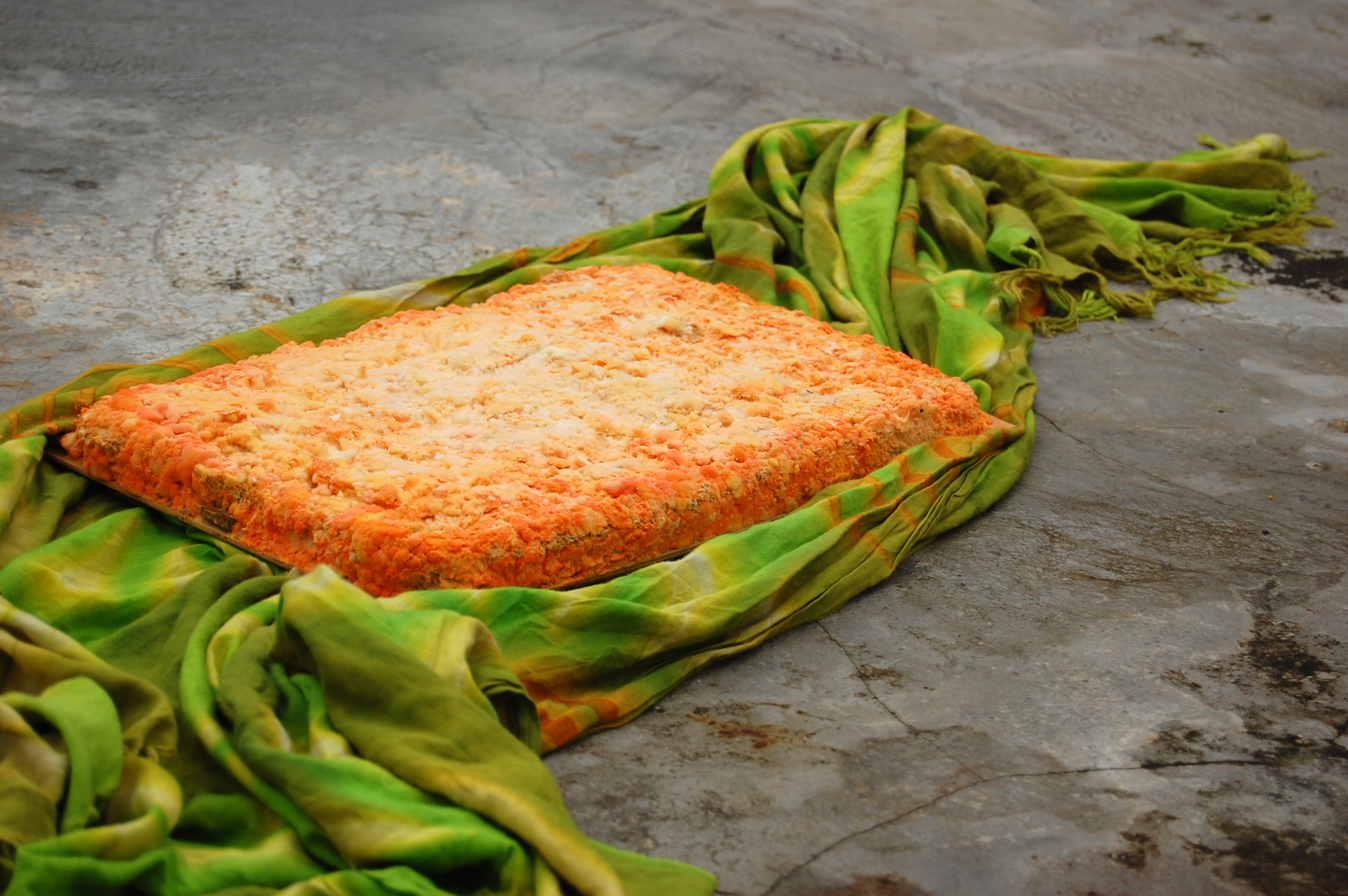
- A block of red oncom
- Course: Main course
- Place of origin: Indonesia
- Region or state: West Java
- Associated cuisine: Indonesia

Oncom (IPA: ɔnˈtʃɔm) is a fermented food which is one of the traditional staples of the Sundanese cuisine of Indonesia. There are two kinds of oncom: red oncom and black oncom. The food is closely related to tempeh; both are fermented using mold.

Usually, oncom is made from the by-products of the production of other foods: soy pulp left over from making tofu, peanut press cake residue after the oil has been pressed out, cassava tailings after extracting the starch (aci sampeu), coconut press cake remaining after the oil has been pressed out or when coconut milk has been produced. Since oncom production uses by-products to make food, it increases the economic efficiency of food production.

Black oncom is made by using Rhizopus oligosporus while red oncom is made by using Neurospora intermedia var. oncomensis. It is the only traditional human food produced from Neurospora.

Red oncom has been found to reduce the cholesterol levels of rats.

== Toxicity ==
In the production of oncom, sanitation and hygiene are important to avoid contaminating the culture with bacteria or other fungi like Aspergillus flavus (which produces aflatoxin). Neurospora intermedia var. oncomensis and Rhizopus oligosporus reduce the aflatoxin produced by Aspergillus flavus. However, aflatoxin-producing molds (Aspergillus spp.) are often naturally present on peanut press cake. Furthermore, coconut press cake can harbor the very dangerous Burkholderia gladioli, which produces two highly toxic compounds – bongkrek acid and toxoflavin. William Shurtleff and Akiko Aoyagi address toxicity in their book section on oncom.

While it is known that soybeans are the best substrate for growing R. oligosporus to produce tempeh, oncom has not been as thoroughly studied; the best fermentation substrates for producing oncom are not yet known.

== Cooking methods ==
Oncom can be prepared and cooked in various ways. It can be simply deep fried as gorengan fritters, seasoned and cooked in a banana leaf pouch as pepes, or roasted, seasoned, and mixed with steamed rice as nasi tutug oncom. Oncom is also a selected filling for comro, lontong and arem-arem rice dumplings. Comro in particular is a popular Sundanese snack, the name was an abbreviation of oncom di jero which means "oncom inside".

== Gallery ==
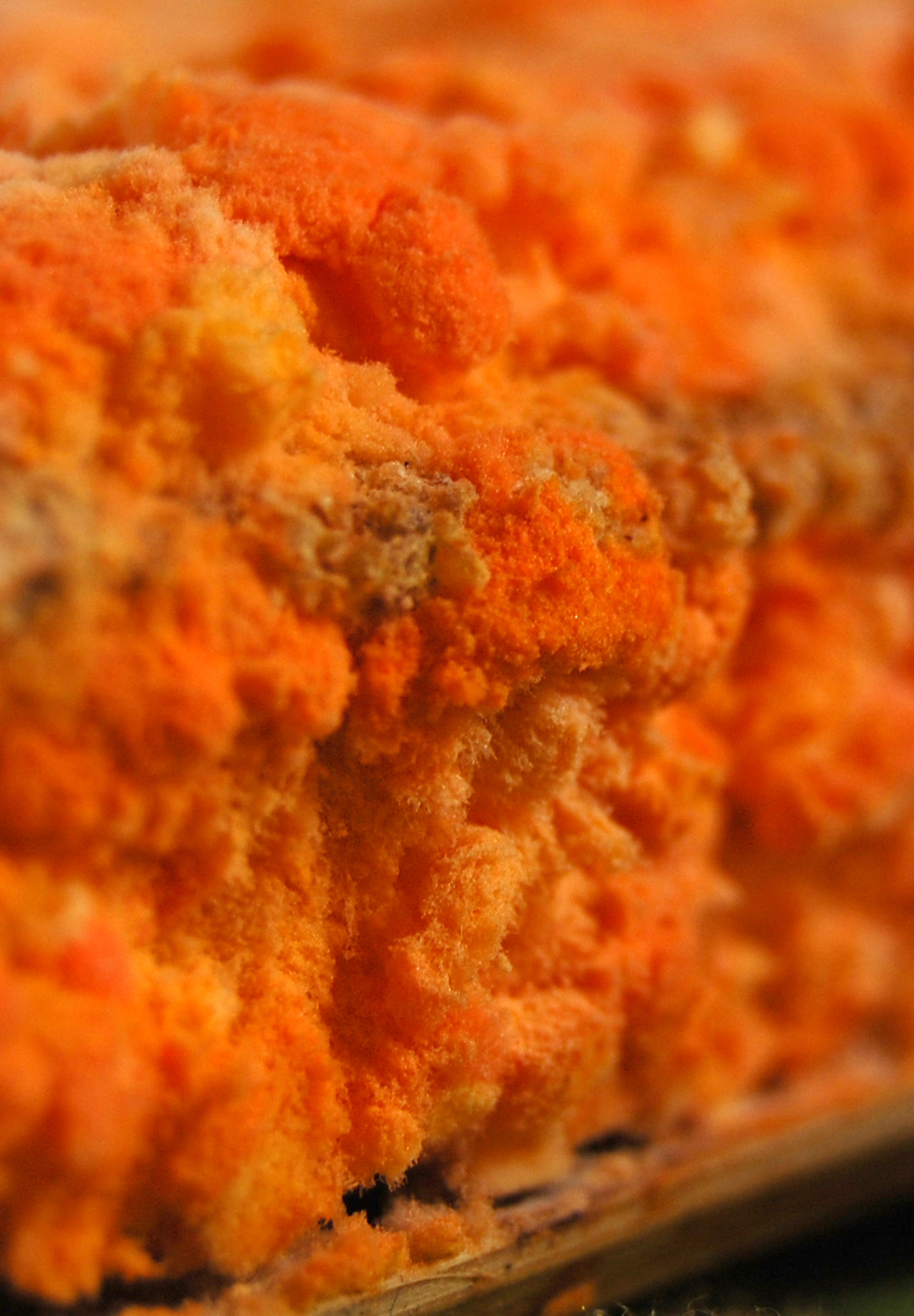
Closer view of red oncom mold

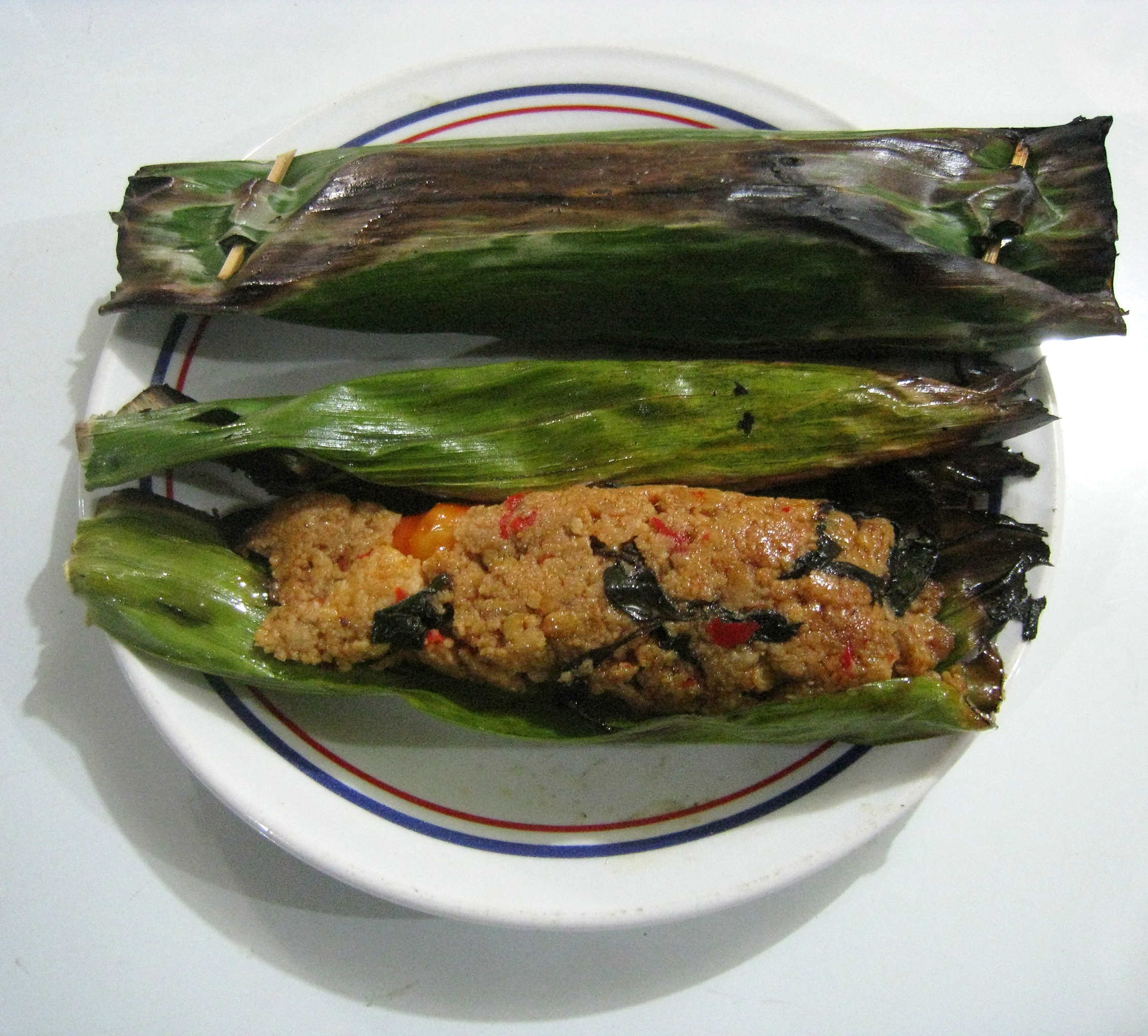
Oncom cooked as pepes dish.

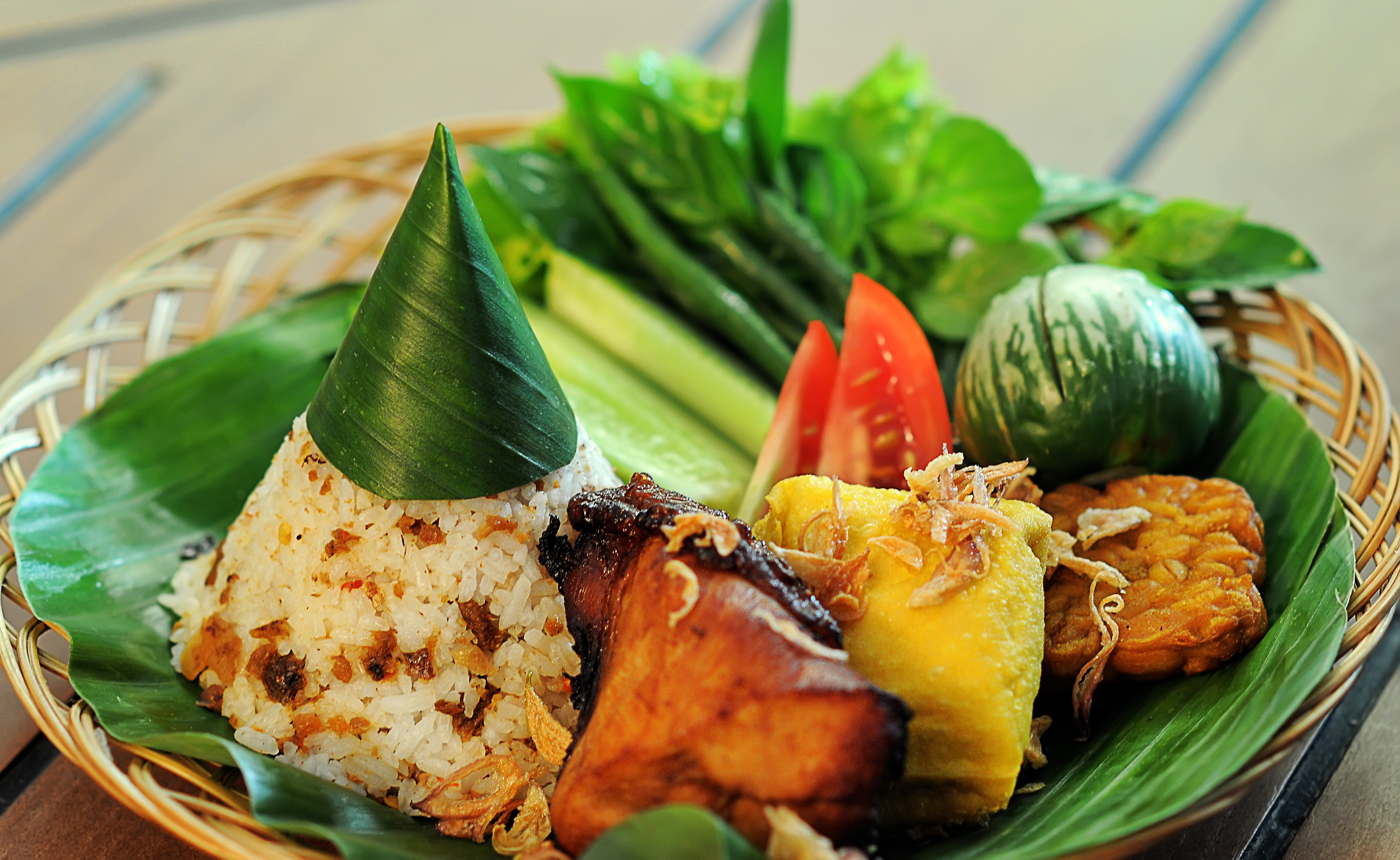
Nasi tutug oncom, roasted oncom mashed with steamed rice, served with side dishes.

== See also ==
- Sundanese cuisine
- Neurospora crassa
