= C7H7N5O2 =

The molecular formula C_{7}H_{7}N_{5}O_{2} (molar mass: 193.16 g/mol, exact mass: 193.0600 u) may refer to:

- 6-Methylisoxanthopterin (6MI)
- Toxoflavin
