= Mozambique funeral beer poisoning =

2015 mass poisoning in Chitima, Mozambique

- Chitima (Mozambique) Location within Mozambique of Chitima, site of the funeral where contaminated pombe was served
- Date: 9 January 2015
- Venue: Funeral
- Location: Tete Province, Mozambique; 15.737°S 32.772°E
- Cause: Contaminated beer, Burkholderia gladioli, bongkrekic acid, toxoflavin.
- First reporter: Radio Mozambique
- Deaths: 75
- Injuries: More than 230

On 9 January 2015, 75 people died and 230 were made ill after drinking contaminated beer at a funeral in Mozambique. All of the people affected had consumed the local beer, pombe, on 9 January, which had been inadvertently contaminated by the bacterium Burkholderia gladioli which produced the toxic compound bongkrekic acid.

Early speculation on the source of the illness by Mozambique officials blamed crocodile bile. A Forbes article opposed this hypothesis and instead pointed to the toxic flowering plant foxglove as the likely source of the poison. Only in November 2015 was it determined that the deaths and illnesses were a result of bacterial contamination of the beer.

== Poisoning ==
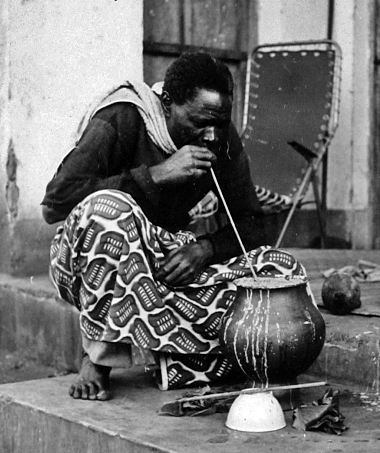
Drinking traditionally brewed pombe in 1967

Radio Mozambique reported that 69 people had died from the villages of Chitima and Songo, both in Tete Province. Following a funeral, 196 were hospitalized on 9 January in the western part of the country. Those affected had consumed homemade pombe beer, a traditional fermented beverage made of sorghum, bran, corn, and sugar with Schizosaccharomyces pombe yeast, a different yeast than those used in Western-style brewing.

The first reported dead on the following day included the drink stand owner, two of her relatives, and four neighbors. Paula Bernardo, director of Health, Women, and Social Action in the Cahora Bassa region, said that area hospitals were flooded with people suffering from cramps and diarrhea and that more people had died. On 12 January, 169 people remained hospitalized, but that number dropped to 35 on 13 January. President Armando Guebuza announced three days of national mourning.

== Investigation ==
Early reports suggested the beer had been poisoned with "crocodile bile", known and sold by local practitioners as "nduru". An alternative early theory, presented in Forbes magazine online, suggested the active ingredient in such poisonings was perhaps a cardiac glycoside, such as digitalis. Digitalis purpurea, the variety of foxglove flower which is the normal source of digitalis, has become common in the area after introduction by European settlers; the foxglove species that is native to Africa, Ceratotheca triloba, resembles the poisonous plant but does not contain digitalis.

In the Forbes article, David Kroll surmises that while crocodile bile is reputed by local villagers to be highly toxic, this is almost certainly false. Crocodile bile resembles mammalian bile which is universally found in the digestive tract of all higher animals. Mice experimentally fed extracts of the bile did not die, and local crocodile farms dried and sold the bile for export to the Far East for use in traditional Chinese medicine. Kroll cites Norman Z. Nyazema, a researcher into traditional practices and culture of Africa, who suggested that organophosphate pesticides may instead be to blame, though the cause of the deaths would remain a mystery until forensic testing was complete.

Samples of the beer, blood, and suspicious objects found within the drum were sent for analysis to the National Laboratory in Maputo. The investigation into the cause of the poisoning eventually turned up the presence of the bacterium Burkholderia gladioli and two toxins which it produced, bongkrekic acid and toxoflavin, in both the beer and the corn flour that was used to help brew it, and concluded that these were responsible for the deaths and illnesses. The investigative team determined that flood-damaged corn flour that had begun to rot had been offered to the brewer in the mistaken belief that, while unfit for use as food, it was still suitable for use in brewing.

== See also ==
- Food security in Mozambique
- 2015 Mumbai alcohol poisoning incident
