= Polam Kopitam poisoning incident =

2024 food poisoning case in Taiwan

Coordinates: 25.0360°N 121.5688°E

Polam Kopitam, the restaurant where the incident occurred

The Polam Kopitam poisoning incident (Chinese: 寶林茶室中毒案) was a major mass food poisoning case that occurred in Taiwan in 2024. In late March, improper food handling at the Polam Kopitam located in Far Eastern Department Store Xinyi A13, Xinyi District, Taipei City, allegedly led to the growth of Burkholderia gladioli, which produced poisonous bongkrekic acid. Starting from the 19th, multiple diners began showing symptoms of food poisoning and sought medical treatment. As of June 12, the incident had resulted in six deaths due to organ failure caused by the poisoning. Another 29 individuals experienced mild symptoms and gradually recovered at home after receiving treatment.

== Background ==
Polam Kopitam was ran by a Malaysian national named "Barney" Li Fang-hsuan. Originally a café, the business transformed into a vegetarian Malaysian cuisine restaurant in January 2021. At the time of the incident, the company operated five branches. The poisoning case occurred at the Polam Kopitam located in the Far Eastern Xinyi A13 branch (whose lease expired on March 31). Another branch at No. 42 Raohe Street, Songshan District, reported suspected cases, but no toxins were detected during follow-up investigations. It was also reported that Li had a poor financial history with previous debts during his business career.

== Incident ==
On March 22, 2024, a 39-year-old male customer surnamed Lü ate vegetarian fried kway teow at Polam Kopitam. After returning home, he gradually developed symptoms including diarrhea, abdominal pain, and heart palpitations. On the 23rd, he sought treatment at the Sanchong branch of New Taipei City United Hospital, where he was given an injection of the anti-inflammatory drug ketorolac and the antiemetic metoclopramide. His symptoms initially improved, but his condition suddenly worsened after returning home and he was rushed to Mackay Memorial Hospital in Taipei in the early morning of the 24th, where he was pronounced dead. The second fatality was a 66-year-old male customer from New Taipei City, surnamed Yang. He also consumed fried kway teow and developed severe diarrhea and chest tightness, eventually dying from multiple organ failure despite emergency medical care.

On the 26th of the same month, Mackay Memorial Hospital reported that a customer who had dined at the restaurant on the 19th developed symptoms such as nausea, diarrhea, and vomiting. On the 21st, they went to the emergency room and were transferred to the intensive care unit due to liver failure. Later, Taipei Medical University Hospital also reported a customer who had been admitted to the ICU and was receiving extracorporeal membrane oxygenation (ECMO). Several more medical institutions subsequently reported food poisoning cases among Polam Kopitam diners, totaling more than ten cases.

On April 5, four critically ill patients were being treated in the intensive care units of Taipei Medical University Hospital, Mackay Memorial Hospital, and the Tri-Service General Hospital. By that date, two of the patients had regained consciousness, and the one on ECMO was gradually improving, with removal of the device under evaluation. Another patient remained in a coma.

On April 15, the Centers for Disease Control’s official website section on the Polam Kopitam food poisoning case reported that all three patients who had been in general hospital wards had returned home for recovery. On April 23, the data was updated to reflect that the number of people recovering at home had been revised from 28 to 29.

== Investigation ==
On the morning of March 27, the Taipei District Prosecutors Office officially announced the launch of a formal investigation into the case. Prosecutors, together with police and relevant agencies, collected evidence at the restaurant site. Meanwhile, the New Taipei City Health Bureau and the Ministry of Health and Welfare’s Food and Drug Administration began inspecting the food ingredients supplied to the restaurant. The Ministry of Health and Welfare also urgently ordered standard samples of bongkrekic acid from abroad for testing purposes. On the same day, Taipei Mayor Chiang Wan-an ordered all Polam Kopitam branches in Taipei to shut down. The Taipei City Government Health Bureau then enforced a full suspension of operations and food service at all Polam Kopitam locations based on the “Act Governing Food Safety and Sanitation.”

On March 28, the Ministry of Health and Welfare, via import records, found that Changhua Christian Hospital already had a stock of bongkrekic acid standards for use in its toxicology lab. Upon contacting the hospital, it agreed to provide the samples free of charge, significantly accelerating the investigation. Later, the Taipei and Shilin District Prosecutors Offices, accompanied by a judge, conducted autopsies at Banqiao Funeral Parlor in New Taipei City and sent samples to the National Taiwan University’s Institute of Forensic Medicine. The final analysis returned a positive result for bongkrekic acid. The Centers for Disease Control (CDC) was also asked to assist in analyzing food and environmental samples to identify the source of the bacteria.

That same morning, prosecutors from the Taipei District Prosecutors Office again convened a special meeting with the Criminal Investigation Bureau, Taipei City Criminal Police Corps, and the Xinyi Precinct to assign tasks, such as interviewing victims, analyzing surveillance footage from the branches, and organizing seized materials. It was decided to summon the chef for questioning. That evening, a chef surnamed Hu appeared at the Xinyi Police Precinct for interrogation. After being questioned, he was transferred late at night to the Taipei District Prosecutors Office for further questioning and was released without bail in the early morning of the 29th. That afternoon, the prosecution summoned the restaurant’s owner, Lai Fang-hsuan, a manager surnamed Wang, and a head chef surnamed Chou as defendants. After questioning, all three were released without bail. Chou, who had just returned to Taiwan from Malaysia, was also listed as a defendant and placed under a travel ban. On March 29, autopsies on two deceased victims confirmed the presence of bongkrekic acid. As of March 31, a total of 12 diners tested positive for bongkrekic acid.

On April 1, it was announced that test results from two suspected cases at the Polam Kopitam Raohe branch were negative, and these were removed from the official tally of bongkrekic acid poisoning cases.

On the morning of April 2, Taipei Mayor Chiang Wan-an stated at a press conference that biological and environmental samples collected on March 24 from the Polam Kopitam at Far Eastern Xinyi A13 tested positive for bongkrekic acid on April 1. The toxic substance was found on two knives, a cutting board, and biological traces from the chef’s hand. However, on April 7, the CDC clarified that only the chef’s hand and stool samples tested positive.

By the afternoon of April 7, at 5:30 p.m., a total of 34 cases had been reported. Of these, 33 cases from March 19 to 24 tested positive for bongkrekic acid. One case, involving a 39-year-old woman who dined on March 18 and was reported on April 6, tested negative.

Additionally, on April 1, four environmental samples collected by Taipei City (a fruit knife, a vegetable knife, a cutting board from the Polam Kopitam kitchen, and the chef’s hand) showed only the chef’s hand sample as positive for bongkrekic acid. The rest were negative. None of the four samples, including the chef’s hand trace, successfully cultured Burkholderia gladioli. The substitute chef's hand and stool samples both tested weakly positive, while the blood test returned negative. Whether this indicates a possible asymptomatic human carrier state remains under further investigation.

== Investigation results and prosecution ==
In January 2025, the Taipei District Prosecutors Office completed its investigation into five individuals involved in the Polam Kopitam poisoning case and formally indicted them for violations of the Act Governing Food Safety and Sanitation as well as for causing injury and death by negligence under the Criminal Code. The indicted included the actual person in charge, Lai Fang-hsuan; store manager Wang Shun-de; a Vietnamese substitute chef named Hu Qingfu; and two other individuals involved in the case. The investigation report indicated that the poisoning incident was linked to improper food handling by the restaurant. A suspected contamination by Burkholderia gladioli was identified as the source of the toxic compound bongkrekic acid. However, due to the difficulty in cultivating this bacterium under laboratory conditions from environmental samples, the exact infection route could not be definitively established.

== Impact ==
=== School lunches ===
By March 30, 2024, a total of 11 counties and cities in Taiwan had suspended the use of products such as kway teow and ban tiao (types of rice noodles) in elementary and middle school lunch programs. Taipei City, New Taipei City, and Taoyuan City continued regular supply but mandated strict inspection and quality control of related ingredients at all school levels.

=== Translation of terminology ===
Prior to this incident, bongkrekic acid had no specific translation in Taiwan. Initially, both official agencies and the media used the mainland Chinese translation (米酵菌酸; mǐ jiào jūn suān). After the incident, public panic led to a significant drop in the sales of rice-based products in Taiwan. On March 29, the Agriculture and Food Agency of the Ministry of Agriculture stated that this was simply the Chinese translation of the English term "bongkrekic acid" and had no direct association with pure rice products. Moreover, the kway teow or rice noodles used by Polam Kopitam were not made solely from rice. To avoid stigmatizing rice products, the translation of bongkrekic acid in Taiwan was officially changed to 邦克列酸; Bāng kè liè suān.

=== Agricultural products ===
The Ministry of Agriculture confirmed that, in the past, Burkholderia gladioli had indeed been detected in decayed king oyster mushrooms and pineapples with Diaporthe-induced rot. However, these strains were not of the coconut toxin subtype, which produces bongkrekic acid. This specific subtype had never been recorded locally, nor had it ever been detected in Taiwanese soil, suggesting that it does not naturally exist in Taiwan. Academia Sinica academician Ho Mei-hsiang also noted that three samples of this bacterium had previously been found in food samples from Guangzhou, China.

=== Mandatory liability insurance registration ===
On April 3, the Food and Drug Administration (FDA) of the Ministry of Health and Welfare announced that, similar to compulsory automobile insurance, it would collaborate with the Ministry of Finance and property insurance companies to require food businesses to proactively register liability insurance information. The system was expected to launch in May.

== Follow-up ==
=== Refunds ===
On March 30, Far Eastern Department Stores and the Food Republic issued a joint announcement: “Customers who dined at the Polam Kopitam Xinyi Branch between March 17 and 25 may bring their receipt and identification to Far Eastern Xinyi A13 starting March 31 to receive a cash refund.”

=== Compensation ===
On March 29, 2024, the Taipei City Government’s Department of Legal Affairs requested that Cathay Century Insurance urgently convene a meeting to determine whether the commercial insurance policy purchased by Far Eastern Department Stores was applicable to this case. The Legal Affairs Department attended the meeting as an observer. After the meeting, Cathay Century Insurance concluded that the case met the criteria for claims under the public liability section of the commercial insurance policy and included Polam Kopitam as an additional insured party.

On December 31, 2024, the Taipei City Government approved an amendment to the "Taipei City Mandatory Public Liability Insurance Measures for Consumer Venues,” expanding the requirement for public liability insurance to include any dining venues open to the general public (excluding bars). The minimum venue size for mandatory insurance was lowered from 300 square meters to 150 square meters, and coverage for food poisoning was added.

=== Doctor-patient dispute rumors ===
The widow of the first deceased victim, Mr. Lü, was previously reported by the media to be planning legal action against New Taipei City United Hospital Sanchong Branch and Mackay Memorial Hospital Taipei Branch for medical negligence. However, on the 29th, she clarified that she had no such intentions. She explained that she had reported the death on the day it occurred to request an autopsy and had provided a complete account of the medical treatment process to the prosecutor. She also expressed gratitude to the hospitals for doing their best to save her husband’s life.

=== Administrative penalties ===
On March 29, 2024, then Taipei Mayor Chiang Wan-an explained: “The Department of Health fined Polam Kopitam NT$500,000 for failing to truthfully disclose the existence of another branch at the earliest stage, and NT$2,000,000 for lacking insurance coverage.” Additionally, after further investigation, it was found that four other branches under Polam had expired product liability insurance policies, resulting in another NT$1,000,000 fine from the Taipei Department of Health. The total administrative fines in this case amounted to NT$3.5 million.

== Public reactions ==
On March 27, 2024, internet celebrity lawyer Lee Yi-chen commented, “I thought this was news from the mainland… I love stir-fried kway teow, seriously? What even caused this?”

Medical journalist Hung Su-ching wrote on her Facebook page “Hung Su-ching’s Food and Medicine Info Network” that “Lai Fang-hsuan’s claim that vegetarian food is safe just because it's vegetarian is absolutely wrong—pathogens eat both meat and plants.”

In an interview with United Daily News, entertainer Hsieh Hsin shared that she had dined at the Polam Kopitam Raohe branch on the 20th and posted a photo of her stir-fried kway teow, saying she was still deeply shaken.She also posted on Threads, “Taiwan’s food safety really needs to improve.”

On the same day, friends of one of the deceased praised his academic achievements at National Taiwan University and National Chengchi University, noting that he was a marketing genius courted by multiple companies. They lamented never having had a final meal with him. The family asked that friends keep their memories in their hearts.

On March 28, singer Aaron Yan posted a photo of a Polam Kopitam delivery order from August 2023 on his Facebook fan page, stating that although he did not order kway teow, he experienced nausea and difficulty breathing the same night after eating. He gradually recovered after two days and offered to share his experience to help with the investigation.

TV host Chen Yi responded critically, suggesting that Aaron Yan, having recently settled a Me Too case, might be eager to stage a comeback and was opportunistically capitalizing on the food safety incident.

Entertainer Christine Ouyang also commented that the incident had completely overturned her perception of dining out. “I used to think keywords like department store, vegetarian, cooked food, famous chain, open kitchen equaled food safety. Now I realize that’s not necessarily the case.”

On March 31, political commentator Kuo Cheng-liang said on the show Mai Yu-chieh’s Hot Evening Report, “We have to respect science. Wood ear mushrooms are common ingredients. Why haven’t they caused problems in the past? Honestly, I still don’t know what went wrong. Today at lunch, my wife left me a delicious vegetarian dish in the fridge. I opened it and saw it was kway teow—and I didn’t dare eat it.”

On April 2, financial journalist Hu Cai-xuan commented that the Taipei City Department of Health had initially collected too few samples, which caused the investigation to stall. However, she acknowledged that if the sampling method followed SOP, then the department could not be faulted. She added that the investigation procedures for suspected food poisoning incidents were later revised following an expert meeting.
