= Arsenic trioxide (medication) =

Use of arsenic trioxide as a medication

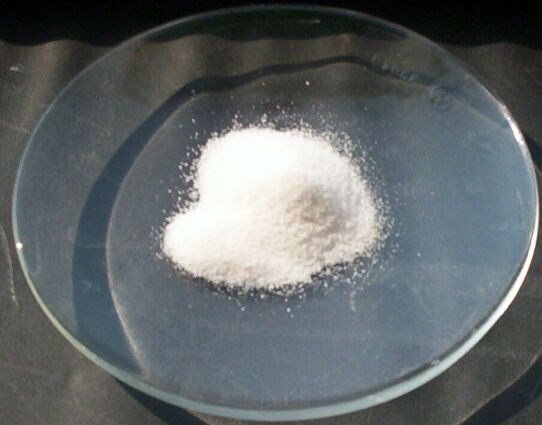

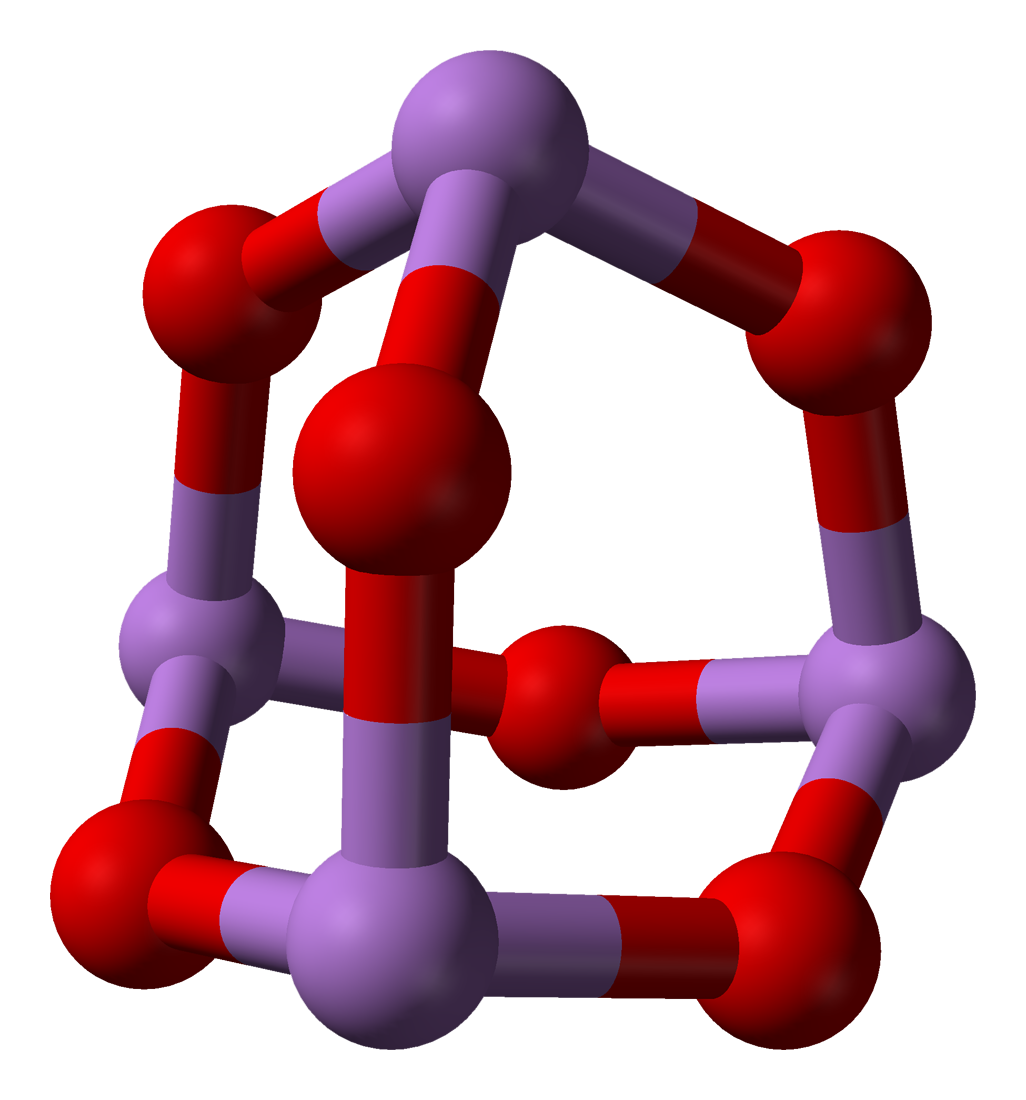
- Arsenic trioxide As O

Clinical data
- Pronunciation: AR-se-nik tri-OKS-id
- Trade names: Trisenox, others
- Other names: Arsenic(III) oxide, Arsenic sesquioxide, Arseneous oxide, Ratsbane, Arseneous anhydride, White arsenic, Aqua Tofani
- AHFS/Drugs.com: Monograph
- MedlinePlus: a608017
- License data: US DailyMed: Arsenic trioxide
- Pregnancy category: AU: D
- Routes of administration: Intravenous
- Drug class: Antineoplastic agent
- ATC code: L01XX27 (WHO)

Legal status
- Legal status: AU: S4 (Prescription only); US: ℞-only; EU: Rx-only

Pharmacokinetic data
- Protein binding: 75%
- Metabolism: methylation
- Elimination half-life: 92 hours
- Excretion: Urine (60% within 8 days)

Identifiers
- CAS Number: 1327-53-3
- PubChem CID: 261004
- DrugBank: DB01169
- ChemSpider: 452539
- UNII: S7V92P67HO
- KEGG: C13619; D02106
- ChEMBL: ChEMBL1200978

Arsenic trioxide (ATO) (Latin: Arsenum trioxydatum) is used as a chemotherapeutic agent in the treatment of acute promyelocytic leukemia (APL). It was approved for medical use in the United States in 2000. Arsenic trioxide is also included on the World Health Organization's List of Essential Medicines.

Despite its therapeutic use, arsenic trioxide is highly toxic and has historically caused numerous cases of acute and chronic arsenic poisoning. It is classified as an orphan drug and is marketed under the brand name Trisenox. When dissolved in water, it forms arsenous acid.

Arsenic trioxide inhibits the proliferation of cancer cells and promotes their differentiation or apoptosis, although its precise mechanism of action remains incompletely understood. Because of its toxicity, arsenic has been used for centuries as a potent poison. Its anticancer properties were recognized in the 20th century, but early efforts to administer it orally were ineffective. Therapeutic benefits were observed only with intravenous administration, particularly in treating the rare cancer acute promyelocytic leukemia.

Initially, arsenic trioxide was used to treat APL only after standard retinoid and chemotherapy regimens had failed. However, it is now commonly used as first-line therapy in combination with tretinoin (ATRA) for patients with non-high-risk APL, rather than solely as salvage therapy following relapse. The treatment is generally well tolerated and associated with relatively few side effects. Ongoing research is investigating additional therapeutic applications for this drug.

== Medical uses ==
Arsenic trioxide has emerged as a therapeutic agent in cancer treatment, especially for acute promyelocytic leukemia (APL). It achieves high remission rates, including among patients with relapsed disease, and offering advantages over other treatments like bone marrow transplantation and all-trans retinoic acid (ATRA), particularly by reducing toxicity and improving patient outcomes. The combined regimen of arsenic trioxide with ATRA is now considered a standard of care for newly diagnosed and relapsed APL, showing substantial efficacy even in pediatric and elderly populations.

Arsenic trioxide is intended for the induction of remission and consolidation in adult patients with acute promyelocytic leukemia who have the t(15;17) translocation and/or the fusion of PML and RARα genes. The drug should be used after treatment failure or relapse. Prior therapy should include retinoid and chemotherapy.

The current standard of care for acute promyelocytic leukemia (APL) is risk-adapted therapy based on the patient’s white blood cell count at diagnosis. For patients with non-high-risk APL (typically defined as a white blood cell count ≤10,000/μL), the preferred treatment is a chemotherapy-free regimen that combines all-trans retinoic acid (ATRA) and arsenic trioxide (ATO), which has demonstrated superior efficacy and a favorable safety profile compared to regimens that include chemotherapy. For high-risk patients (white blood cell count >10,000/μL), treatment usually entails ATRA plus ATO along with the addition of chemotherapy (such as idarubicin) during induction to rapidly control leukocytosis and reduce early death and relapse risk.

Effectiveness appears similar to Realgar/Indigo naturalis, which can be taken by mouth and is less expensive but is less available. It works by encouraging the proteosome breakdown of retinoic acid receptor alpha, by moving the protein on to the nuclear matrix and increasing ubiquitination. This use was approved for leukemia treatment in the United States in 2000. A liquid form of arsenic trioxide that can be given by mouth, (Oral-ATO; ARSENOL^{®}) for the treatment of acute promyelocytic leukaemia.

=== Available forms ===
Arsenic trioxide (ATO) is available in both intravenous (IV) and oral formulations for clinical use. The IV form is widely approved and used as the standard for treating acute promyelocytic leukemia (APL), requiring daily infusions. Recent advances have led to the development of oral formulations, including liquid and solid (tablet/pill) preparations, designed to provide comparable bioavailability and efficacy to IV ATO.

Specific formulations include:

- Trisenox – Almac Pharma – 1 mg/mL concentrate for intravenous therapy. Trisenox is packaged in 10 mL ampoules for single use. The ampoules contain a pure solution of arsenic trioxide, without preservatives, and also contain sodium hydroxide and hydrochloric acid. The solution has a pH of 7–9. The drug should be stored at room temperature and must not be frozen. After withdrawing the solution from the ampoule, it should be diluted in 100–250 mL of 5% glucose or saline solution. Arsenic trioxide should not be mixed or administered in the same infusion with other medications.
- In pharmaceutical compounding, arsenic trioxide was used in a 1:10 trituration with lactose (Trituratio Acidi arsenicosi 1/10). To prepare the trituration, one part arsenic trioxide is placed in a mortar, and while continuously grinding, nine parts of lactose are added in portions. Achieving a uniformLy distributed trituration requireson

== Pharmacology ==
=== Mechanism of action ===
==== Toxicity ====
Arsenic trioxide exerts its toxicity primarily through the induction of oxidative stress, disruption of cellular energy production, and interference with key protein functions. One major mechanism involves the generation of reactive oxygen species (ROS), leading to oxidative modifications of cellular biomolecules, organelle damage, and ultimately cell death. Arsenic trioxide also inhibits critical cellular enzymes such as pyruvate dehydrogenase, thereby disrupting mitochondrial ATP production and cellular respiration, which results in energy failure and can trigger both necrotic and apoptotic cell death. Furthermore, it can interfere with DNA repair processes by inhibiting enzymes involved in base and nucleotide excision repair and by interacting with protein structures such as zinc fingers in repair proteins. In cardiac tissues, arsenic trioxide disrupts ion channel function, notably by blocking the hERG potassium channel and altering calcium channel activity, which can lead to prolonged QT intervals and arrhythmias, sometimes causing fatal cardiac events. The broad range of affected signaling and metabolic pathways helps explain the widespread multi-organ toxicity associated with arsenic trioxide exposure.

==== Anti-infective ====
Arsenic trioxide has shown efficacy against a range of pathogens due to its broad-spectrum antimicrobial, antiviral, and antiparasitic properties. However the significant toxicity of arsenic trioxide has greatly limited its use as an anti-infective agent.

Historically, it was used to treat infections such as syphilis and trypanosomiasis before the advent of modern antibiotics. Recent research highlights its potential in combating multidrug-resistant bacteria, with certain sulfur-containing polyarsenicals exhibiting potent activity against Staphylococcus aureus, a major human pathogen. Arsenic trioxide has also demonstrated antiviral activity, notably inhibiting hepatitis C virus (HCV) replication at submicromolar concentrations and disrupting adenoviral infection by modulating host cell nuclear structures. The discovery of organoarsenical antibiotics like arsinothricin underscores arsenic trioxide’s potential as a direct antimicrobial agent targeting emerging and resistant pathogens.

==== Cancer ====
The mechanism of action of arsenic trioxide anti-cancer effects is complex and not fully understood. Generally, the drug inhibits the proliferation of cancer cells and induces their differentiation and/or apoptosis, which can occur in various ways depending on the involved organelles and biochemical processes. Arsenic trioxide induces apoptosis through:

- Interaction with cell membrane receptors (extrinsic pathway)
- Interaction with mitochondria (intrinsic pathway)

The first of these pathways involves the binding of a ligand to a receptor located on the surface of the cell membrane. The interaction of these two entities leads to the activation of various genes and releases a cascade of proteins characteristic of the apoptosis process.

Arsenic trioxide also interacts with mitochondria. One of the initial changes in their structure induced by the drug is the opening of megachannels and the release of so-called "death proteins", primarily cytochrome c, APAF-1 (apoptotic peptidase activating factor 1), AIF (apoptosis-inducing factor), Smac/DIABLO protein, and endonucleases from the intermembrane space of mitochondria into the cytosol. In the cytoplasm, a protein complex known as the apoptosome forms, which activates further processes leading to apoptosis.

Regardless of whether apoptosis is induced externally or internally, it always involves caspases, whose activation irreversibly leads the cell down the path of programmed cell death. Additionally, apoptosis is regulated by proteins from the Bcl-2 family, which can act as either pro-apoptotic or anti-apoptotic factors.

The cause of acute promyelocytic leukemia is the translocation of the gene encoding the retinoic acid receptor (RARα) from chromosome 17 to a location near the PML gene on chromosome 15. This leads to the fusion of genes and the production of the PML/RARα protein. This protein inhibits differentiation and the death of the cells in which it is present. Arsenic trioxide, even at low concentrations, causes the degradation of PML/RARα, thereby partially restoring the differentiation of cancerous promyelocytes.

Arsenic trioxide activates JNK (c-Jun N-terminal kinase), also known as stress-activated protein kinase, which belongs to the MAPK (mitogen-activated protein kinase) family. These enzymes play a crucial role in signal transduction within the cell. Under normal conditions, JNK is activated by the phosphorylation of threonine and tyrosine residues. However, studies on specific cell lines derived from patients with acute promyelocytic leukemia have demonstrated that this activation also occurs in response to arsenic trioxide.

It seems that the activation of JNK leads to the phosphorylation of both anti-apoptotic proteins (Bcl-2, Bcl-Xl) and pro-apoptotic proteins – Bax (Bcl-2-associated X protein), Bak (Bcl-2 homologous killer), and Bid (BH3 interacting domain death agonist) – effectively activating them. Pro-apoptotic proteins contain the BH3 domain, which is responsible for their "death-inducing" activity. They cause the formation of ion channels in the mitochondrial membrane, resulting in the release of the aforementioned apoptotic factors into the cytoplasm. Anti-apoptotic proteins owe their function to a hydrophobic cleft in their spatial structure that binds to the BH3 domain, thereby neutralizing the effects of the "death" proteins. Under normal conditions, the decision for a cell to undergo apoptosis depends on the ratio of pro-apoptotic to anti-apoptotic proteins. In the case of arsenic trioxide-induced apoptosis, two mechanisms play a significant role in increasing the levels of pro-apoptotic proteins. The first is related to the functioning of the transcription factor NF-κB (nuclear factor kappa-light-chain-enhancer of activated B cells). NF-κB exists in the cytoplasm in an inactive state, in a complex with the specific reaction inhibitor IκB (IKK). This complex consists of two catalytic subunits – IKKα and IKKβ – and a regulatory unit IKKγ/NEMO. The phosphorylation and degradation of the inhibitor release NF-κB, which then translocates to the cell nucleus and activates genes responsible for producing "survival" proteins (such as p53, Bcl-2, and other inhibitors of apoptosis). NF-κB also protects cells from apoptotic stimulation involving the TNF-α receptor. Arsenic trioxide binds to the cysteine at position 179 of IKKβ, thus preventing the release of NF-κB. The absence of this protein in the cytoplasm allows for the induction of apoptosis via the extrinsic pathway and activates caspases 3 and 8.

This mechanism has been observed not only in acute promyelocytic leukemia cells and Hodgkin lymphoma but also in patients with myelodysplastic syndrome. The second mechanism that increases the levels of pro-apoptotic proteins is the downregulation of bcl-2 gene transcription. This effect has been observed in HL-60 and NB4 human leukemia cells.

In 2003, Japanese researchers discovered that arsenic trioxide induces apoptosis not only through the TNF-α receptor. Studies indicate that the drug also acts pro-apoptotically through the CD95 receptor, which affects the activation of caspases 8 and 3. In multiple myeloma cells, arsenic trioxide interacts with the APO2/TRAIL receptor, activating caspases 8 and 9.

Arsenic trioxide also affects the intracellular concentration of glutathione, which is a crucial component of the redox system (it removes radicals and reduces hydrogen peroxide). It also participates, along with peroxidase and catalase, in regulating the levels of reactive oxygen species. Arsenic trioxide inhibits glutathione peroxidase, thereby decreasing its concentration in the cell, which leads to an increase in the levels of reactive oxygen species. These, in turn, increase the permeability of the mitochondrial membrane, causing the release of apoptotic factors and initiating the apoptosis process.

Additionally, arsenic trioxide degrades poly(ADP-ribose) polymerase, which, combined with the activation of caspases, inhibits DNA repair and halts the cell cycle. The phase of the cell cycle at which the blockage occurs primarily depends on the p53 protein. In cells containing the so-called "wild type" (non-mutated) p53, the cell cycle is halted in the interphase, while in cells with mutated p53, it is halted in the G_{2}/M phase.

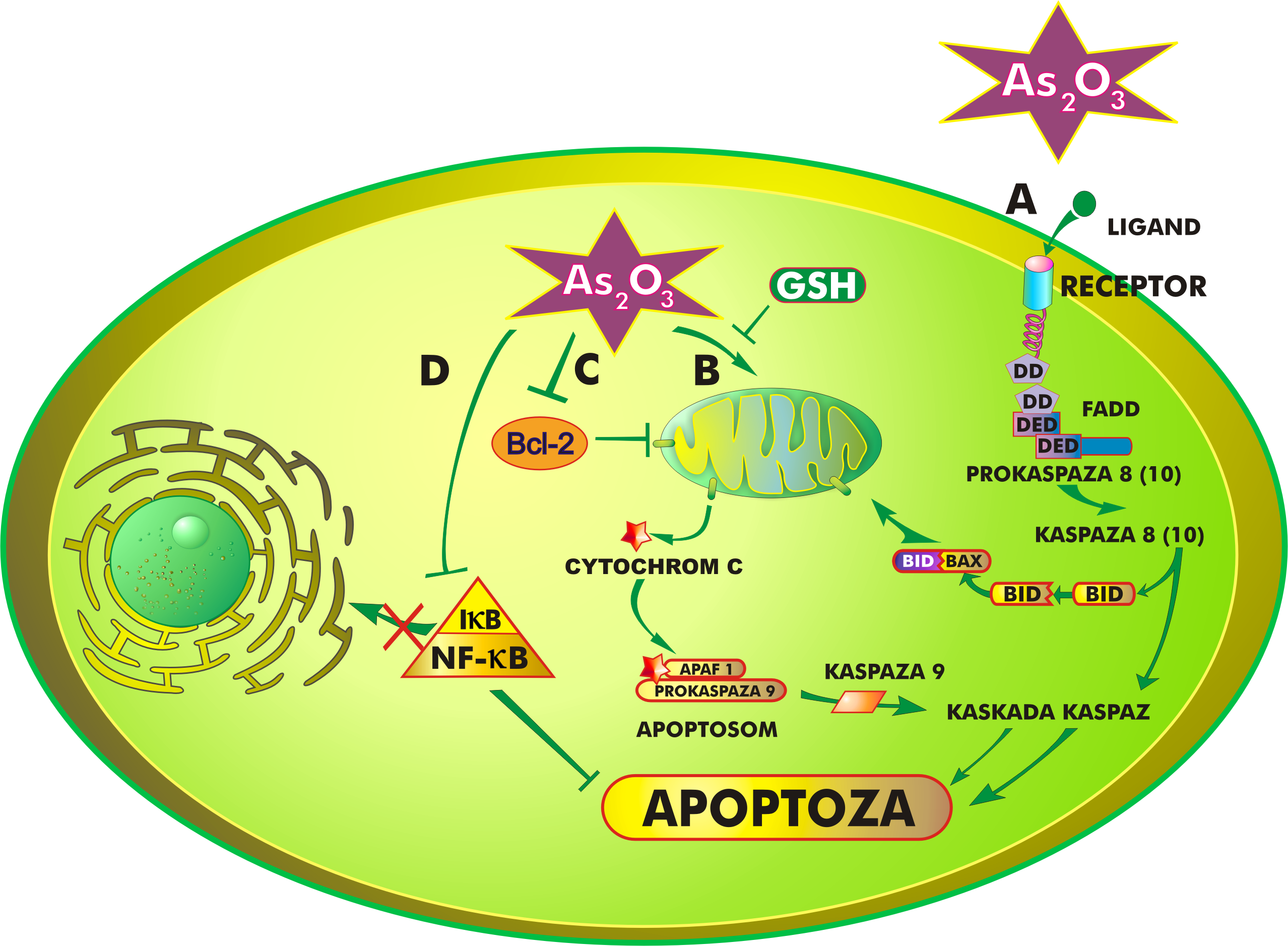
Mechanism of action of arsenic trioxide. The illustration presents four main therapeutic pathways of arsenic trioxide: A – external apoptosis pathway, B – mitochondrial pathway, C – interaction of arsenic trioxide with Bcl-2 family proteins, D – impact of arsenic trioxide on the NF-κB transcription factor.

=== Pharmacokinetics ===
Detailed pharmacokinetic studies on arsenic trioxide have not been conducted. When administered intravenously, a steady state is reached after 8–10 days. Arsenic binds to proteins to an insignificant extent. The highest concentrations of arsenic are found in the liver, kidneys, heart, lungs, hair, and nails. Arsenous acid is oxidized to arsenic acid and methylated in the liver, and then excreted 60% in the urine. The drug has a half-life of 92 hours. Arsenic trioxide is neither a substrate nor an inhibitor of cytochrome P450 isozymes (1A2, 2A6, 2B6, 2C8, 2C9, 2C19, 2D6, 2E1, 3A4/5, 4A9/11).

== Side effects ==
Side effects were reported in 37% of patients treated with arsenic trioxide. However, these effects were generally mild and resolved during treatment. Patients tolerated consolidation therapy better than induction therapy. The most common side effects include:

- Hyperglycemia
- Hypokalemia
- Neutropenia
- Elevated AlAt levels
- Leukocytosis

Severe adverse effects are relatively rare and include:

- Leukocyte activation syndrome
- QT interval prolongation (only one case of torsades de pointes was noted during clinical trials)
- Atrial fibrillation or flutter

Other side effects include allergic skin reactions (including reactions at the injection site, injection site pain), gastrointestinal disturbances (diarrhea), various types of pain, visual disturbances, and bleeding. If the drug extravasates, local irritation and phlebitis may occur.

== Overdose ==
In the event of arsenic poisoning (manifesting as seizures, muscle weakness, confusion), the administration of the drug should be immediately discontinued, and appropriate treatment should be initiated. Penicillamine is commonly used at a dose of up to 1 g/day. For patients unable to take oral medications, dimercaprol can be administered intramuscularly at a dose of 3 mg/kg body weight every 4 hours until life-threatening symptoms subside. In cases of coagulopathy, DMSA is recommended at a dose of 10 mg/kg body weight every 8 hours for 5 days, followed by every 12 hours for 2 weeks. Kidney dialysis may also be considered.

== Special warnings ==
To ensure the safe use of arsenic trioxide, the following precautions should be observed:

- 25% of patients treated with arsenic trioxide exhibited symptoms resembling leukocyte activation syndrome, characterized by high fever, shortness of breath, weight gain, pulmonary infiltrates with pleural or pericardial exudation, with or without leukocytosis. High doses of steroids (10 mg dexamethasone intravenously, 2–3 times per day) appear to alleviate these symptoms.
- 40% of patients treated with arsenic trioxide experienced at least one instance of prolonged QT interval, corrected to over 500 ms. QT interval prolongation can lead to ventricular arrhythmias, such as torsades de pointes.
- Prior to initiating arsenic trioxide treatment, an ECG should be performed, and blood levels of potassium, calcium, magnesium, and creatinine should be checked. Any abnormalities, particularly a prolonged QT interval on the ECG, should be corrected before starting arsenic trioxide. Any medications that may prolong the QT interval should be discontinued if possible.
- Patients receiving arsenic trioxide, particularly those at risk for torsades de pointes, should be closely monitored during treatment.
- If toxicity reaches level 3 (as per National Cancer Institute criteria), treatment should be modified or discontinued before the planned completion of therapy. Patients can resume treatment only after symptoms subside, starting with 50% of the prior daily dose. The dose can be increased to the previous level if no toxicity symptoms appear within 3 days. If toxicity reappears, treatment with arsenic trioxide cannot continue.
- During the induction phase, electrolyte levels, glucose, blood counts, and liver and kidney function should be tested twice a week. In the consolidation phase, these tests should be performed weekly.
- Caution is advised in patients with kidney failure.
- During arsenic trioxide treatment, women of childbearing age and men capable of fathering children should use effective contraception. The impact of arsenic trioxide on fertility has not been thoroughly studied.

== Interactions ==
Arsenic trioxide is known to prolong the QT interval. If possible, medications that also prolong QT should not be used concurrently, including:

- Class Ia and III antiarrhythmics (e.g., quinidine, amiodarone, sotalol, dofetilide)
- Certain psychiatric medications (e.g., amitriptyline, thioridazine)
- Some macrolides (e.g., erythromycin)
- Some antihistamines (e.g., terfenadine, astemizole)
- Some quinolones (e.g., sparfloxacin)
- Other QT-prolonging drugs (e.g., cisapride)

Prior use of:

- Anthracyclines
- Amphotericin B
- Non-potassium-sparing diuretics
- Other drugs causing hypokalemia or hypocalcemia

increases the likelihood of torsades de pointes.

== History ==
In the 18th century, William Withering discovered that arsenic trioxide, when used in small doses, exhibited therapeutic effects. During the same period, Thomas Fowler prepared a 1% solution of arsenic and potassium carbonate, which was used to treat skin diseases (primarily psoriasis) until the 20th century. An arsenic-based drug, arsphenamine, was also developed for the treatment of syphilis, synthesized by Paul Ehrlich, though it was eventually replaced by penicillin. Arsenic compounds were widely used to treat various diseases in the 19th and early 20th centuries.

The first reports of the anticancer activity of arsenic trioxide date back to 1878, when a report from Boston City Hospital described Fowler's solution lowering leukocyte levels in the blood of two healthy individuals and one patient. Arsenic trioxide continued to be used in the treatment of leukemia until the introduction of radiotherapy. It made a resurgence in the 1930s when the first studies confirmed the high efficacy of arsenic trioxide in treating chronic myelogenous leukemia.

In the late 1960s, physicians working at the Harbin Medical Academy in China were sent to a center focusing on traditional Chinese medicine, where they used a melanoma ointment, with arsenic as its main ingredient. At that time, the arsenal of anticancer drugs was limited, prompting doctors to experiment with arsenic. Early trials used oral administration, but it showed strong toxic effects. In March 1971, the first trials of intravenous arsenic began, which showed significantly lower toxicity. For many years, arsenic trioxide was administered to patients with various cancers, showing the best results in the treatment of acute promyelocytic leukemia. More than half of the patients from the first trial in Harbin survived for five years, prompting further research across other centers in China, and eventually at the Sloan-Kettering Memorial Institute in New York. The results of clinical trials were favorable enough that in 2000, the drug received FDA approval.

== Clinical studies ==
Arsenic trioxide was clinically tested in two open-label, single-arm trials without a control group, involving 52 patients with acute promyelocytic leukemia who had previously been unsuccessfully treated with anthracyclines and retinoids. The results of these studies are presented in the table below.

Study	Single-center n=12	Multi-center n=40
Dose of arsenic trioxide (mg/kg body weight/day)	0.16 (median: 0.06–0.20)	0.15
Complete remission	11 patients (92%)	34 patients (85%)
Average time to bone marrow remission	32 days	35 days
Average time to achieve complete remission	54 days	59 days
18-month survival rate	67%	66%
n – number of patients participating in the study

Studies have also been conducted on the effect of arsenic trioxide on other cancers. These showed that the drug also induces apoptosis in lung cancer cells (especially in combination with sulindac). The efficacy of arsenic trioxide has also been demonstrated in the treatment of multiple myeloma, in combination with ascorbic acid and bortezomib.

Animal studies have shown that the drug also affects ovarian, liver, stomach, prostate, and breast cancers, as well as gliomas and pancreatic cancer (in combination with parthenolide). However, attempts to use arsenic trioxide in the treatment of solid tumors have been limited by the drug's toxicity.

Arsenic trioxide also appears promising for treating autoimmune diseases (based on studies in mice).

== Research ==
Beyond acute promyelocytic leukemia (APL), research is exploring arsenic trioxide’s antitumor effects in solid tumors such as glioma, where it induces cancer cell death by regulating apoptosis and autophagy, promoting oxidative stress within tumor cells, and inhibiting tumor stem cells.
