= Food security in Mozambique =

Security of food in the East African nation of Mozambique

It is estimated that 64 percent of Mozambique's population is food insecure. The prevalence is higher in the southern region (75 percent). Mozambique is a net importer of food. Total annual cereal import requirements average 0.89 million tons (0.14 million of maize, 0.39 of rice and 0.36 of wheat). Mozambique must also import substantial quantities of meat and livestock products.

Despite good land and water availability, much of the food system relies on smallholder farmers which are vulnerable to natural disasters, exacerbating food insecurity challenges.

== Health factors ==
Health in Mozambique is affected by the food insecurity of the country.

According to the 2009 Human Development Report of the United Nations Development Programme, about 55 percent of the population of Mozambique is living in poverty, nearly half is illiterate, 40 percent is undernourished, only 47 percent have access to safe water, and there is a standing life expectancy at birth of only 48 years. Mozambique ranked 165th out of 169 countries in the human development index. Much of this is a result of the food insecurity in the country.

The country has one of the highest HIV/AIDS prevalence rates in the world. The prevalence of the HIV/AIDS virus in Mozambique is a further point of vulnerability for poor rural households, aggravating poverty and malnutrition levels. These factors put the country’s agricultural production at risk.

== Farming practices ==
With more than 70 percent of its population dependent on agriculture for livelihood, Mozambique’s food security can be extremely volatile. 90% of the land is made up of farms of 10 hectares (25 acres) or less. Large-scale productive farming is virtually non-existent.

Mozambique suffers from multiple plagues. The most devastating by far for agriculture is the red locust, which is endemic in the Pungwe basin.

== Natural disaster ==
Mozambique is particularly vulnerable to natural disasters such as droughts and floods, with a total of 15 over the last 25 years. These events greatly damaged the rural sector and the country’s overall economy. For example, the floods of 2000 affected some 2 million people, while the droughts of 1994 and 1996 affected 1.5 million people in the southern and central parts of the country.

Cyclones in Mozambique occur during the cropping season, from October to April. For example, in February 2007, Cyclone Flávio caused widespread damage in Inhambane, Sofala and Manica provinces.

The poor are particularly vulnerable to weather-induced risks simply by virtue of their poverty. Poor households have few assets to sell and their consumption is already low, so in times of scarcity they do not have much to buffer them from food insecurity. Most households have little income or real food security, and women-headed households have even less.

Mozambique has a relatively well-developed system of disaster preparedness plans at the district level. Donor-funded projects related to the National Early Warning System help the government cope with food insecurity.

== See also ==
- Mozambique funeral beer poisoning
- Agriculture in Mozambique
- Food security in Burkina Faso

== Bibliography ==
- Food and Agricultural Organization (FAO) and World Food Program (WFP). Special Report Crop and Food Security Assessment Mission to Mozambique, 12 August 2010. Text Online: http://www.fao.org/docrep/012/ak350e/ak350e00.htm#3
- United Nations Development Program (UNDP). International Human Development Indicators. Text Online: http://hdr.undp.org/en/statistics/
- Food and Agricultural Organization (FAO). Nutrition Country Profile for Mozambique. Text Online: http://www.fao.org/ag/AGN/nutrition/moz_en.stm
- The World Bank. Mozambique Agricultural Development Strategy Stimulating Smallholder Agricultural Growth, February 23, 2006. Text Online: http://siteresources.worldbank.org/MOZAMBIQUEEXTN/Resources/Moz_AG_Strategy.pdf
- The World Bank. Mozambique at a glance, 2/25/2011. Text Online: https://web.archive.org/web/20110721020914/http://devdata.worldbank.org/AAG/moz_aag.pdf
