= Agriculture in Mozambique =

Mozambique has a variety of regional cropping patterns; agro-climatic zones range from arid and semi-arid (mostly in the south and south-west) to the sub-humid zones (mostly in the centre and the north) to the humid highlands (mostly the central provinces). The most fertile areas are in the northern and central provinces, which have high agro-ecological potential and generally produce agricultural surpluses. Southern provinces have poorer soils and scarce rainfall, and are subject to recurrent droughts and floods.

== Production ==
Mozambique produced, in 2018:

- 8.5 million tons of cassava (9th largest producer in the world);
- 3 million tons of sugarcane;
- 1.6 million tons of maize;
- 625 thousand tons of sweet potato;
- 578 thousand tons of banana;
- 343 thousand tons of tomatoes;
- 273 thousand tons of potato;
- 227 thousand tons of coconut;
- 138 thousand tons of onion;
- 134 thousand tons of rice;
- 108 thousand tons of cashew nuts (11th largest producer in the world);
- 107 thousand tons of peanut;
- 93 thousand tons of tobacco;
- 90 thousand tons of sorghum;
- 89 thousand tons of cowpea;
- 85 thousand tons of castor bean;
- 66 thousand tons of pineapple;
- 65 thousand tons of sesame seed;
- 50 thousand tons of beans;
- 48 thousand tons of cotton;

In addition to smaller productions of other agricultural products.

== Farming Industry ==
Mozambique has the fifth highest proportion of women working in agriculture, forestry and fishing in the world.

With the large majority of agricultural production being rain-fed, weather variability is a major factor in determining crops performance. The main growing season starts with the first rains in September in the south and December in the north. There is also a minor growing season, based on residual soil moisture, from March to July, accounting for approximately 10 percent of total output.

Agriculture is for the most part based on small, hand-cultivated units often farmed by women-headed households. About 97 percent of production comes from some 3.2 million subsistence farms averaging 1.2 hectares. The smallholder sector in Mozambique is characterized by holdings of multiple small plots, multiple crops, rain-fed water, traditional varieties, low intensity fertilizer and pesticide use and little or no mechanization, and low productivity. Most households diversify to cope with low productivity and income. The majority practice extensive shifting cultivation, only about one-third sell any crop output, and almost two-thirds live in households that lack food security.

Mozambique's surface or total area is 784.955kmq, i.e.: 78.5 million hectares. There are about 36 million hectares of arable land, suitable for agriculture. However, only ten percent of the arable land, 3.9 million hectares, is estimated to be cultivated. The remainder of the total area is under pastures (44 million ha) and forest /woodlands (30.7 million ha)

About 118,000 hectares are equipped for irrigation, covering 3% of the potential land.

Crops

Food crop production is the most important agriculture sub-sector accounting for around 80 percent of the cultivated area (2009). Maize and cassava are the major staples; other food crops include sorghum, millet, rice, beans, groundnut, sweet potatoes and a wide variety of vegetables. Maize is grown in all regions of the country by about 79 percent of rural households and occupies about 35 percent of total planted area. Cassava is grown mainly in the north and south-east, where it is the main staple. This crop is an important component of the smallholder’s risk reduction strategy because it is drought tolerant and resistant to disease. Groundnut is cultivated on sandy soils in most locations and makes an important contribution to household diet and income. The main cash crops are tobacco, cotton, sesame, sugar and tea. Tree crops, especially coconut and cashew, grown by small farmers, are an important source of foreign exchange earnings, and contribute to household food security. wild plums are also cultivated in Mozambique.

Technology and Techniques

The use of modern technologies and irrigation facilities is limited to a small number of commercial farms growing cash crops and vegetables and to out-growers of tobacco and cotton-producing crops on contract. Average crop yields are about half of the regional standard estimates indicating huge scope for improvement.

Animal husbandry is an underdeveloped sector. Cattle, goats, sheep and pigs are reared in extensive grass-based (ruminants) or back-yard scavenger systems. There is, also a small fast-growing modern poultry industry. In 2009, livestock accounted for 1.2 million of head of cattle, 4.5 million sheep and goats, 1.3 million pigs, and 18 million poultry. Beef production was estimated at 22,000 tons; pig meat, 91,000 tons; poultry meat, 22,000 tons; cows' milk, 75,000 tons; and hen eggs, 14 million. The high prevalence of disease is the main constraint undermining an increase in livestock numbers. For example, Newcastle disease is a major ubiquitous problem for poultry, in the northern provinces tsetse flies affect cattle, and African swine fever affects pigs. The southern region is the heart of livestock activities because animals there are less prone to diseases.

== Beyond Farming ==
In the fisheries sub-sector, some 1,500 species are believed to live in the Mozambican seawaters, of which 400 are of commercial importance. In 2008, captures of fishery and aquaculture production totalled 120,000 tons. The potential catch is estimated at 500,000 tons of fish. South African trawlers are allowed to fish in Mozambican waters in return for providing a portion of their catch to Mozambique. The European Community, Italy, and Japan have each entered into agreements designed to help develop the fishing industry.

== Climate and Geography ==
Thick forest covers the wet regions, where there are fertile soils, but the drier interior, which has sandy or rocky soils, supports only a thin savannah vegetation. Extensive stands of hardwood, such as ebony, flourish throughout the country. Wood production is from natural forests and is almost entirely consumed by the local rural populations for fuel and construction. Forests constitute an estimated 30.7 million hectares. In 2009, the timber cut was approximately 36 million cu m.

== Bibliography ==
- Food and Agriculture Organization (FAO). Statistic Yearbook 2010. Text Online: https://www.fao.org/economic/ess/ess-publications/ess-yearbook/en/
- Food and Agriculture Organization (FAO). Country Profiles – Mozambique. Text Online: http://www.fao.org/countryprofiles/index.asp?lang=en&ISO3=MOZ
- Food and Agriculture Organization (FAO). Emergency Mozambique Fact Sheet. Text Online: https://www.fao.org/fileadmin/templates/tc/tce/pdf/Mozambique_factsheet.pdf
- Food and Agriculture Organization/World Food Program (FAO/WFP). Special Report and Food Security Assessment Mission to Mozambique, 12 August 2010. Text Online: https://www.fao.org/docrep/012/ak350e/ak350e00.htm#3
- United Nations Development Programme (UNDP). International Human Development Indicators. Text Online: https://hdr.undp.org/en/statistics/
- The World Bank. Mozambique at a glance, 2/25/2011. Text Online: https://web.archive.org/web/20110721020914/http://devdata.worldbank.org/AAG/moz_aag.pdf
- The World Bank. Mozambique Agricultural Development Strategy Stimulating Smallholder Agricultural Growth, February 23, 2006. Text Online: http://siteresources.worldbank.org/MOZAMBIQUEEXTN/Resources/Moz_AG_Strategy.pdf
- African Development Fund (ADF). Mozambique 2006-09 Country Strategy Strategy Paper, April 2006. Text Online: http://www.afdb.org/fileadmin/uploads/afdb/Documents/Project-and-Operations/ADB-BD-WP-2006-47-EN-MOZAMBIQUE-CSP-2006-2009-REVISED-FINAL.PDF
- Encyclopedia of the Nations, Mozambique. Text Online: http://www.nationsencyclopedia.com/Africa/Mozambique-FORESTRY.html
- Waterhouse, Rachel. Vulnerability in Mozambique: Patterns, trends and responses, Paper presented to the IESE Conference Poverty Dynamics and Patterns of Accumulation in Mozambique, Maputo, 22–23 April 2009. Text Online: http://www.iese.ac.mz/lib/publication/II_conf/GrupoIV/Vulnerability_WATERHOUSE.pdf

== See also ==
- Food Security in Mozambique
