= Tutug oncom =

Indonesian rice dish

Nasi tutug oncom
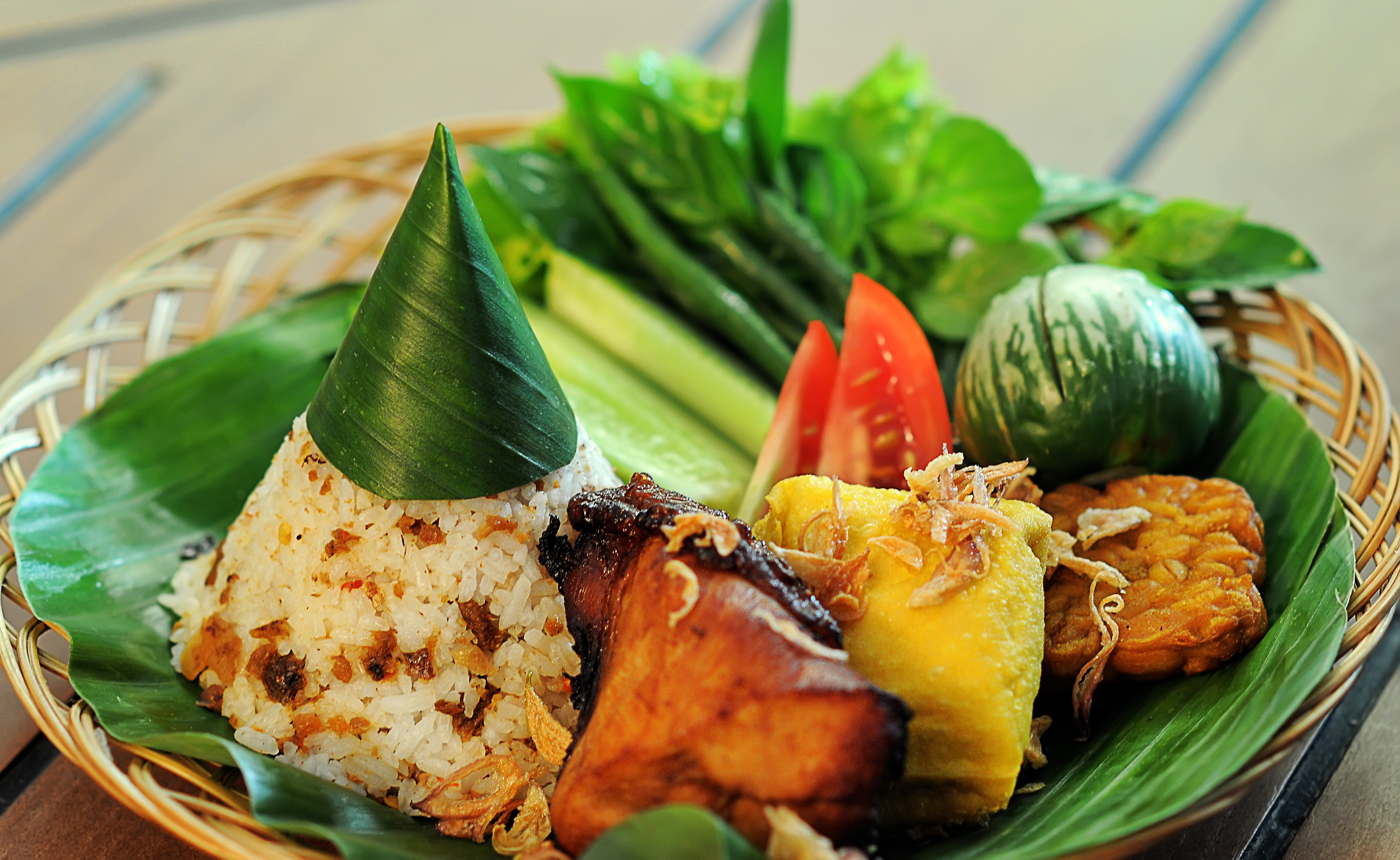
- Nasi tutug oncom, served with ayam bakar, tahu and tempe goreng also lalab vegetables
- Alternative names: Tutug oncom
- Course: Main course
- Place of origin: Indonesia
- Region or state: Tasikmalaya, West Java
- Serving temperature: Hot or room temperature
- Main ingredients: Fragrant rice mixed with roasted oncom served with side dishes

Nasi tutug oncom or sometimes simply called tutug oncom, is an Indonesian style rice dish, made of rice mixed with oncom fermented beans, originally from Tasikmalaya, West Java. It is usually wrapped in banana leaves and served with various side dishes.

Nasi tutug oncom is a Sundanese dish, quite popular in most of cities in West Java, especially Bandung and Tasikmalaya, and also in Greater Jakarta area.

== Etymology ==
Nasi is common Indonesian term for rice, while tutug in Sundanese means "mashed", "mixed" or "pulverized", and oncom is fermented beans cake akin to tempeh, but made from different fungi. Therefore, the name describe a rice dish that was mixed with mashed oncom.

== Origin and history ==
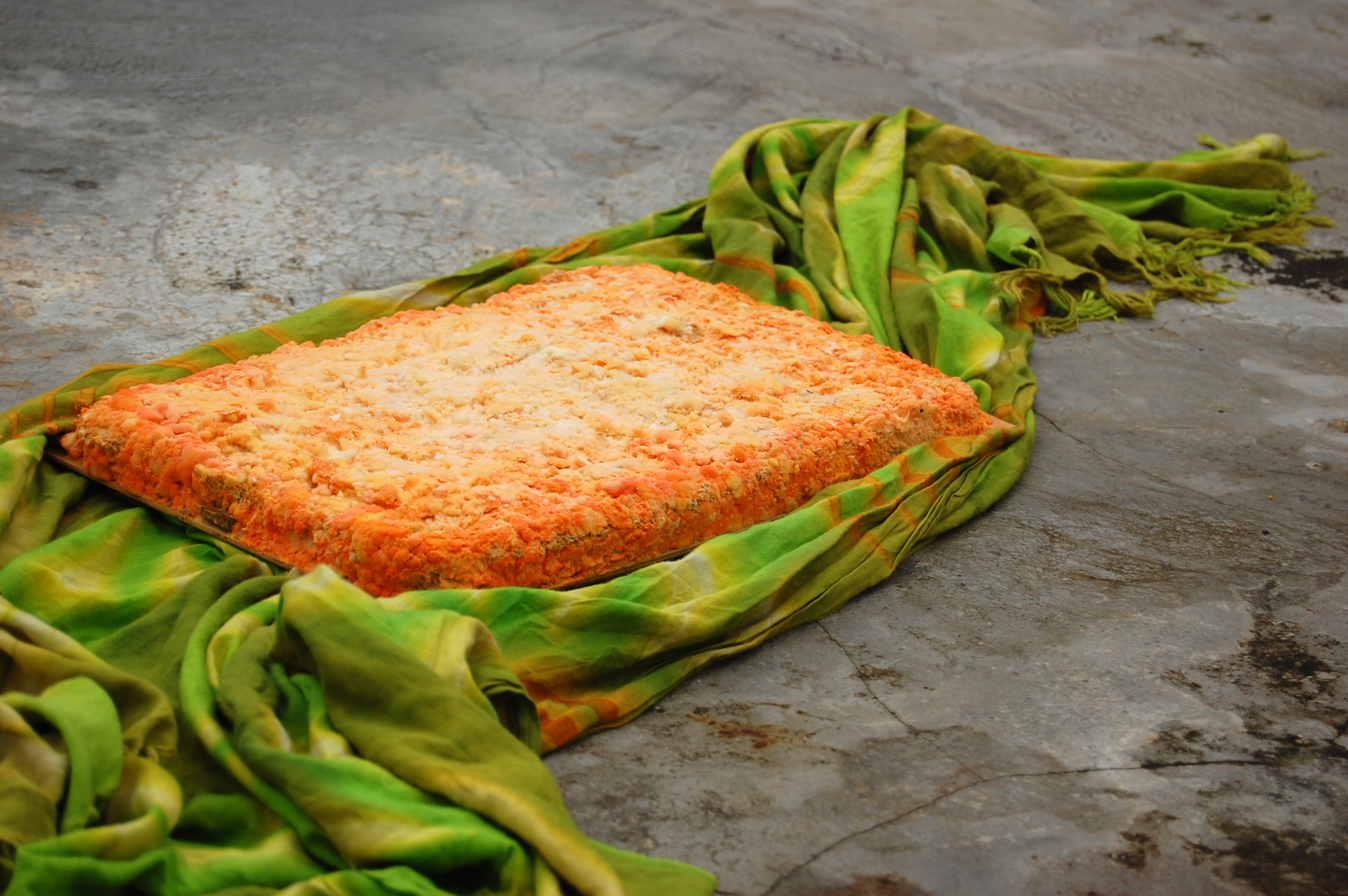
Oncom fermented beans, an ingredient of nasi tutug oncom.

The exact origin of nasi tutug oncom was not clear. However, it has been staples for breakfast among Sundanese population for generations. According to some circles, since the 1940s nasi tutug oncom has been served as a simple, cheap and quite satisfying breakfast. During that time Indonesians endured hardships due to the outbreak of the Pacific War and Indonesian war of independence, thus oncom was a simple and cheap source of nutrients. Initially, the oncom was lightly roasted added with salt, without any seasonings, and consumed with steamed rice. Then for practical reasons, the roasted oncom was mashed together with rice, and then wrapped in banana leaf.

This modest background had led to an image in the past that nasi tutug oncom was a food for poors. Nevertheless, the savoury flavour of the rice mixed with roasted oncom fermented beans had led to the popularity of this rice mix; started in Eastern Priangan region to Bandung, to Jakarta, and then to the rest of Indonesia. Particularly today, after this oncom rice had elevated its status; being served with assorted choices of savoury side dishes to make it more satisfying and nutritionally balanced.

Since 2019, nasi tutug oncom is served in Garuda Indonesia in-flight meal in its domestic routes, along with the choices of nasi goreng spesial (special fried rice), lontong sate ayam (chicken satay with rice cakes), and nasi ulam (rice cooked with herbs).

== Ingredients ==
The bumbu spice mixture used in this dish are shallot, garlic, red chili pepper, kencur (a kind of galangal) and salt, all are pulverized into a paste, stir fried in cooking oil, add with roasted oncom fermented beans, mixed with steamed rice, then wrapped in banana leaf, and sprinkled with crispy fried shallots.

== Side dishes ==
Nasi tutug oncom is usually wrapped in banana leaf and served with a choice of side dishes, of which Indonesian traditional fried chicken ayam goreng is a popular one. This method of serving is quite similar to other Indonesian fragrant dish nasi uduk that is also consumed with an array of protein sources.

It may be served with chicken either fried as ayam goreng or grilled as ayam bakar, salted fish, fried tofu and tempeh, sunny-side fried egg, lalab vegetables; usually slices of cucumber and tomato with lemon basil leaf, krupuk crackers, and also sambal chili paste as a hot and spicy relish.

== Other rice dishes ==
- Nasi bogana
- Nasi campur
- Nasi goreng
- Nasi gudeg
- Nasi Kapau
- Nasi kebuli
- Nasi kucing
- Nasi kuning
- Nasi lemak
- Nasi liwet
- Nasi Padang
- Nasi pecel
- Nasi timbel
- Nasi uduk
- Nasi ulam

== See also ==
- Cuisine of Indonesia
- List of Indonesian cuisine
- Sundanese cuisine
