= Gladiolin =

Names
- IUPAC name (8E,10E,14E,16R,17R)-6-Hydroxy-4,14,16-trimethyl-17-[(2S,4R,8S,10Z,12E,15S,16S,18R,19S,20R)-4,16,18,20-tetrahydroxy-8-methoxy-15,19-dimethyl-22-oxo-1-oxacyclodocosa-10,12-dien-2-yl]octadeca-8,10,14-trienoic acid

Identifiers
CAS Number	1812860-15-3
3D model (JSmol)	Interactive image
ChemSpider	78440583
PubChem CID	139590156
- InChI: InChI=1S/C45H76O10/c1-31(18-13-9-8-10-15-20-37(46)27-32(2)24-25-44(51)52)26-34(4)35(5)43-28-38(47)21-17-23-39(54-7)22-16-12-11-14-19-33(3)40(48)29-41(49)36(6)42(50)30-45(53)55-43/h8-12,14-16,26,32-43,46-50H,13,17-25,27-30H2,1-7H3,(H,51,52)/b9-8+,14-11+,15-10+,16-12-,31-26+/t32?,33-,34+,35+,36-,37?,38+,39+,40-,41+,42+,43-/m0/s1 Key: QOJUVWWXRXLGFG-WIDAHPLTSA-N
- SMILES: C[C@H]1C/C=C/C=C\C[C@H](CCC[C@H](C[C@H](OC(=O)C[C@H]([C@H]([C@@H](C[C@@H]1O)O)C)O)[C@H](C)[C@H](C)/C=C(\C)/CC/C=C/C=C/CC(CC(C)CCC(=O)O)O)O)OC

Properties
Chemical formula	C_{44}H_{74}O_{11}
Molar mass	779.065 g·mol^{−1}
- Except where otherwise noted, data are given for materials in their standard state (at 25 °C [77 °F], 100 kPa). Infobox references

Gladiolin is a polyketide natural product produced by Burkholderia gladioli BCC0238. It was found to be a novel macrolide antibiotic which presented an activity against Mycobacterium tuberculosis. Gladiolin is structurally much more stable than its analogue etnangien as an efficient mycobacterial RNA polymerase inhibitor due to the lack of highly labile hexaene moiety in gladiolin. The good activity and high stability of gladiolin offers it the potential for further development as an antibiotic against antibiotic-resistant M. tuberculosis.

== Potential uses ==
Because of the structure similarity between gladiolin and etnangien, gladiolin was proved to inhibit RNA polymerase, which is a validated drug target in M. tuberculosis including isoniazid- and rifampicin-resistant M. tuberculosis clinical isolates. Gladiolin also exhibits low mammalian cytotoxicity and high stability.

== History ==
Burkholderia is a prolific producer of many antimicrobial compounds, for example, thailanstatin, spliceostatin,, rhizoxin, and others. Gladiolin was discovered in Burkholderia gladioli BCC0238, which was first isolated in 1996 from the sputum of a child with cystic fibrosis. The discovery and biosynthesis of gladiolin was first reported in May 2017 by University of Warwick and Cardiff University. They also claimed that gladiolin presents promising activity against M. tuberculosis.

== Biosynthesis ==
Gladiolin is assembled by trans-acyltransferase polyketide synthase (PKS). The gladiolin PKS contains 20 KS domains, 17 of which are predicted to catalyze chain elongation, the rest of them act as transacylases. The initiation step was proposed to be transacylation of the succinyl moiety of succinyl-CoA onto the active site Cys residue in the N-terminal ketosynthase domain of GbnD1 and was supported by phylogenetic analyses.

Gladiolin biosynthesis
