= Arsinothricin =

Clinical data
- Drug class: glutamine synthetase inhibitor

Identifiers
- IUPAC name: 2-amino-4-[hydroxy(methyl)arsoryl]butanoic acid
- CAS Number: 2267352-87-2
- PubChem CID: 170988177
- PDB ligand: BLJ (PDBe, RCSB PDB)

Chemical and physical data
- Formula: C_{5}H_{12}AsNO_{4}
- Molar mass: 225.076 g·mol^{−1}
- 3D model (JSmol): Interactive image
- SMILES: C[As](=O)(CCC(C(=O)O)N)O
- InChI: InChI=InChI=1S/C5H12AsNO4/c1-6(10,11)3-2-4(7)5(8)9/h4H,2-3,7H2,1H3,(H,8,9)(H,10,11); Key:CXTQPLOKUBDLTK-UHFFFAOYSA-N

Arsinothricin is a naturally occurring organoarsenical antibiotic produced by the rhizosphere bacterium Burkholderia gladioli. Ongoing research suggests that it may be an effective antimalarial medication, functioning both as a treatment and as transmission control by effectively blocking the transmission of Plasmodium falciparum to mosquitos from infected individuals.
