= 6-Methylisoxanthopterin =

Names
- IUPAC name 2-Amino-6-methyl-1,8-dihydropteridine-4,7-dione
- Other names 6-MI; 6MI

Identifiers
CAS Number	712-38-9
3D model (JSmol)	Interactive image
ChemSpider	306197
ECHA InfoCard	100.149.651
PubChem CID	345267
UNII	ZFA4TQK4XW
CompTox Dashboard (EPA)	DTXSID00323009
- InChI: InChI=1S/C7H7N5O2/c1-2-5(13)10-4-3(9-2)6(14)12-7(8)11-4/h1H3,(H4,8,10,11,12,13,14) Key: DYXQYFTUVSIKIG-UHFFFAOYSA-N
- SMILES: CC1=NC2=C(NC1=O)NC(=NC2=O)N

Properties
Chemical formula	C_{7}H_{7}N_{5}O_{2}
Molar mass	193.166 g·mol^{−1}
- Except where otherwise noted, data are given for materials in their standard state (at 25 °C [77 °F], 100 kPa). Infobox references

6-Methylisoxanthopterin (6MI) is a base analog for the nucleotide guanine. It is useful as a fluorescent indicator because unlike most other base analogs, quenching does not occur when it is incorporated into a double helix. In fact, it exhibits a 3 to 4-fold increase in quantum yield when it is incorporated into a duplex formation. This allows 6MI to be used to probe the dynamics of DNA or RNA helices using a technique such as fluorescence polarization anisotropy.

== See also ==
- 5-Bromouracil
