= Burkholderia gladioli =

Scientific classification
- Domain: Bacteria
- Kingdom: Pseudomonadati
- Phylum: Pseudomonadota
- Class: Betaproteobacteria
- Order: Burkholderiales
- Family: Burkholderiaceae
- Genus: Burkholderia
- Species: B. gladioli

Binomial name
- Burkholderia gladioli (Zopf 1885); Yabuuchi et al. 1993

Type strain
- ATCC 10248; CCUG 1782; CFBP 2427; CIP 105410; DSM 4285; HAMBI 2157; ICMP 3950; JCM 9311; LMG 2216; NBRC 13700; NCCB 38018; NCPPB 1891; NCTC 12378; NRRL B-793

Synonyms
- Pseudomonas gladioli Severini 1913; Burkholderia cocovenerans (van Damme et al. 1960) Gillis et al.. Pseudomonas cocovenenans van Damme et al. 1960; Pseudomonas antimicrobica Attafuah and Bradbury 1990; Pseudomonas marginata (McCulloch) Stapp; Pseudomonas farinofermentans Naixin; Pseudomonas alliicola (Burkholder 1942) Starr and Burkholder 1942

Species of bacterium

Burkholderia gladioli is a species of aerobic gram-negative rod-shaped bacteria that causes disease in both humans and plants. It can also live in symbiosis with plants and fungi and is found in soil, water, the rhizosphere, and in the microbiome of many animals. It was formerly known as Pseudomonas marginata.

Burkholderia gladioli synthesizes several inhibitory substances, among them gladiolin, bongkrek acid, enacyloxin, arsinothricin, and toxoflavin. Those molecules might participate in antagonistic interactions with other microbes in the environment where they grow. One pathovariety, growing on coconut pulp, produces bongkrek acid, a mitochondria-disrupting toxin which can cause fatal poisoning in humans.

== Nomenclature ==
The members of the genus Burkholderia were formerly classified as Pseudomonas, but Burkholderia was one of the seven genera that arose when Pseudomonas was divided based on rRNA differences. Burkholderia gladioli is closely related to, and often mistaken for, a member of the Burkholderia cepacia complex. This includes ten closely related species, which are all plant pathogens.

Burkholderia gladioli is divided into several pathovars:

- B. gladioli pv. gladioli causes gladiolus rot
- B. g. pv. alliicola causes onion bulb rot
- B. g. pv. agaricicola causes soft rot in mushrooms
- B. g. pv. cocovenerans (sometimes written as cocovenenans) spoils coconut pulp

== Etymology ==
The genus Burkholderia is named after scientist Walter H. Burkholder, who discovered an organism linked to disease in the skin of onions.

The specific epithet gladioli refers to the plant genus Gladiolus, which is grown ornamentally around the world, and where the fungus can cause rot. The flower is named gladiolus "little sword" from gladius "sword", due to the shape of the leaves.

== Identification ==
Burkholderia are motile, Gram negative rods that may be straight or slightly curved. They are aerobic, catalase positive, urease positive, nonsporeformers. They grow on MacConkey agar, but do not ferment the lactose. Burkholderia gladioli can be distinguished from the other Burkholderia because it is oxidase negative. B. gladioli is indole negative, nitrate negative, and lysine decarboxylation negative.

On the molecular level, PCR can be used to distinguish between the different Burkholderia species. According to Furuya et al., the ribosomal RNA gene is highly conserved and universally distributed in all living things, and therefore difference in the DNA sequences between 16S and 23S rRNA genes can be used to differentiate between the species.

The primers used for the amplification of the 16S to 23S region in the B. gladioli genome are as follows: GLA-f 5'-(CGAGCTAATACCGCGAAA)-3' and GLA-r 5'-(AGACTCGAGTCAACTGA)-3' Using these primers for PCR results in an amplicon of approximately 300 bp.

All members of the genus Burkholderia have multireplicon genomes. They are able to keep "essential housekeeping" genes on the largest chromosome. This largest chromosome has a single origin of replication. The gene order and GC composition is conserved as well. Members of Burkholderia are able to capture and retain foreign DNA. The foreign DNA can be detected by looking for atypical GC context areas. One of the first foreign DNA segments detected this way encoded for virulence.

The B. gladioli genome consists of 6 major holders of genetic information: two chromosomes and four plasmids. The entire genome amounts to 9.06 Mb (Million Bases) with 89.64% of the genome – including non-coding regions – on the two chromosomes.

== Characteristics ==
All species of the genus Burkholderia – except for B. mallei – display a form of motility when suspended within liquid. Being Gram-Negative, B. gladioli will not retain the Crystal Violet – Iodine complex following decolorization, but will be counter stained red by Safranin. The optimal growth temperature on a nutrient agar plate is 30–35 °C. The Genus Burkholderia (including B. gladioli) shows a remarkable amount of diversity of metabolism of carbohydrates and other organic compounds. B. gladioli is able to more acids than is typical for its genus.

| Test type | Test | Characteristics |
|---|---|---|
| Colony characters | Size | |
| Colony characters | Type | Round |
| Colony characters | Color | Pale Yellow |
| Colony characters | Shape | |
| Morphological characters | Shape | Slightly Bent Rods |
| Physiological characters | Motility | + |
| Physiological characters | Growth at 6.5% NaCl | |
| Biochemical characters | Gram staining | - |
| Biochemical characters | Oxidase | d |
| Biochemical characters | Catalase | |
| Biochemical characters | Oxidative-Fermentative | |
| Biochemical characters | Motility | + |
| Biochemical characters | Methyl Red | |
| Biochemical characters | Voges-Proskauer | |
| Biochemical characters | Indole | |
| Biochemical characters | H_{2}S Production | |
| Biochemical characters | Urease | |
| Biochemical characters | Nitrate reductase | |
| Biochemical characters | β-Galactosidase | |
| Hydrolysis of | Gelatin | + |
| Hydrolysis of | Starch | - |
| Hydrolysis of | Casein | |
| Utilization of | Glycerol | |
| Utilization of | Galactose | + |
| Utilization of | D-Glucose | + |
| Utilization of | D-Fructose | + |
| Utilization of | D-Mannose | + |
| Utilization of | Mannitol | + |

== Pathology ==
=== In plants ===
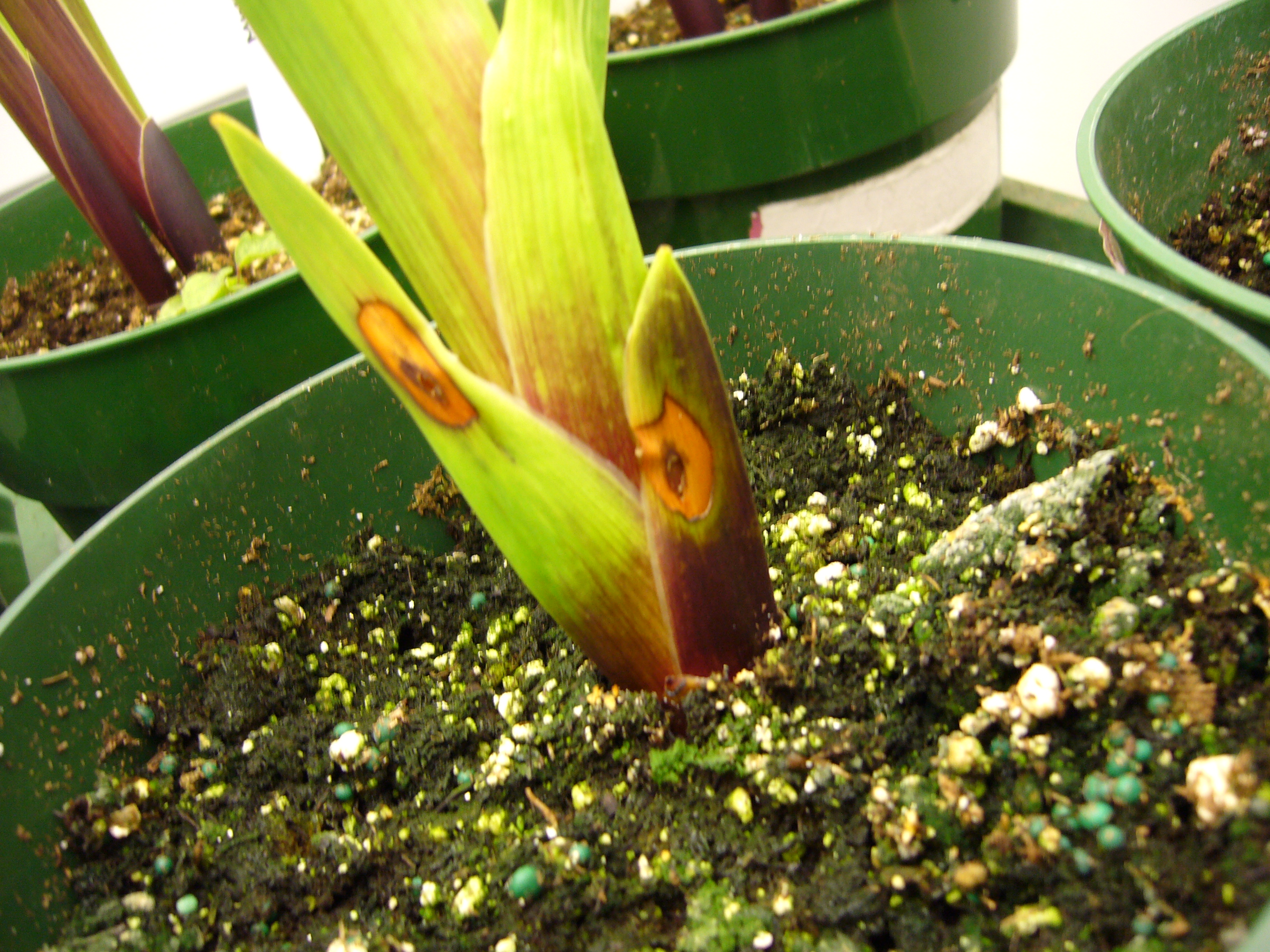
Gladiolus plant inoculated with B. gladioli

B. gladioli has been identified as a plant pathogen in onions, gladiolus, iris, and together with Burkholderia glumae affect the rice. It was originally described to have caused rot of gladiolus corms. The bulbs can become water soaked and decay.

Some other common symptoms of infected plants can be seen in the leaves. The leaves contain brown lesions, and they may become watersoaked. Other symptoms are the wilting and/or rot of roots, stems, and petals. B. gladioli has also been identified as the causative agent in leaf-sheath browning in gladiolas and onions. Sometimes, the whole plant decays.

One widespread plant disease caused by B. gladioli is called scab. It can be seen on gladiolus corms as water-soaked brown spots, outlined in yellow. Eventually, they can become hollow and surrounded by scabs. If the scabs fall off, they leave behind cavities or lesions.

=== In humans ===
B. gladioli in humans is an opportunistic pathogen that is an important agent for hospital-associated infections. It has recently appeared as a severe pathogen in patients with cystic fibrosis, causing severe pulmonary infections. Though it is still a fairly uncommon pathogen, its presence is associated with a poor prognosis. It has also colonized the respiratory tracts of patients with granulomatous disease. In lung transplant patients, infection can be fatal as patients have developed bacteremia and sterile wound infections as a result.

Tempe bongkrèk, a variation of tempeh prepared with coconut, is susceptible to B. gladioli pathovar. cocovenenans contamination. Contaminated tempe bongkrèk can contain lethal amounts of highly toxic bongkrek acid and toxoflavin.

B. gladioli was implicated in the 2015 deaths of 75 people, in Mozambique, who had consumed a home-brewed beer made from corn flour that was contaminated with the bacterium.

A 3-year long study period of neonatal and nosocomial sepsis yielded 14 patients (out of approximately 3784) with isolated positive colonies of B. gladioli from blood cultures. Accompanying diagnosis included pneumonia and several other respiratory malfunctions. A mortality rate of 7% is linked to the B. gladioli infections present during the time of study.

=== Virulence factors ===
The primary system responsible for the disease caused by Burkholderia gladioli is a type two secretion pathway. An experiment performed by Chowdhury and Heinemann revealed that six strains of B. gladioli that were avirulent still contained the capacity for mushroom growth inhibition without having the characteristics of mushroom tissue degradation. This led the two to believe the genetic factors that cause the microbe to have the ability to generate the cavity disease within an organism can be separated from the factors that inhibit mycelium growth within said mushrooms.

== Research ==
Gladiolin, a novel macrolide produced by B. gladioli strain BCC0238, was found to have promising antibiotic activity against Mycobacterium tuberculosis in a 2017 study; the compound, which inhibits RNA polymerase, is structurally and functionally similar to etnangien, a macrolide synthesised by the bacterium Sorangium cellulosum which has also demonstrated potency against Mycobacterium, but is more unstable than gladiolin. In the study, gladiolin was found to have low mammalian cytotoxicity and good activity against M. tuberculosis isolates, suggesting that it may be a useful starting point in developing new antibiotics to treat multidrug resistant tuberculosis infections.
