= Bongkrek acid =

Chemical compound

Names
- Preferred IUPAC name (2E,4Z,6R,8Z,10E,14E,17S,18E,20Z)-20-(Carboxymethyl)-6-methoxy-2,5,17-trimethyldocosa-2,4,8,10,14,18,20-heptaenedioic acid
- Other names Bongkrekic acid Bongkrekik acid

Identifiers
CAS Number	11076-19-0
3D model (JSmol)	Interactive image; Interactive image
ChEBI	CHEBI:77742
ChemSpider	4938689 (2E,4E,8E,10E,14E,18E,20E); 4529223 (2E,4Z,8Z,10E,14E,18E,20Z); 23764 (6R,17S); 2329 ()
MeSH	Bongkrekic+acid
PubChem CID	25463 (6R,17S); 2423 ()
UNII	L7V4I673D2
CompTox Dashboard (EPA)	DTXSID00894840
- InChI: InChI=1S/C28H38O7/c1-21(15-18-24(19-26(29)30)20-27(31)32)13-11-9-7-5-6-8-10-12-14-25(35-4)22(2)16-17-23(3)28(33)34/h6,8-12,15-19,21,25H,5,7,13-14,20H2,1-4H3,(H,29,30)(H,31,32)(H,33,34) Key: SHCXABJSXUACKU-UHFFFAOYSA-N; InChI=1/C28H38O7/c1-21(15-18-24(19-26(29)30)20-27(31)32)13-11-9-7-5-6-8-10-12-14-25(35-4)22(2)16-17-23(3)28(33)34/h6,8-12,15-19,21,25H,5,7,13-14,20H2,1-4H3,(H,29,30)(H,31,32)(H,33,34)/b8-6+,11-9+,12-10-,18-15+,22-16-,23-17+,24-19+/t21-,25+/m0/s1 Key: SHCXABJSXUACKU-WUTQZGRKBG; InChI=1S/C28H38O7/c1-21(15-18-24(19-26(29)30)20-27(31)32)13-11-9-7-5-6-8-10-12-14-25(35-4)22(2)16-17-23(3)28(33)34/h6,8-12,15-19,21,25H,5,7,13-14,20H2,1-4H3,(H,29,30)(H,31,32)(H,33,34)/b8-6+,11-9+,12-10-,18-15+,22-16-,23-17+,24-19+/t21-,25+/m0/s1 Key: SHCXABJSXUACKU-WUTQZGRKSA-N
- SMILES: COC(CC=CC=CCCC=CCC(C)C=CC(CC(O)=O)=CC(O)=O)C(C)=CC=C(C)C(O)=O; O=C(O)\C(=C\C=C(\C)[C@H](OC)C/C=C\C=C\CC/C=C/C[C@@H](/C=C/C(=C\C(=O)O)CC(=O)O)C)C

Properties
Chemical formula	C_{28}H_{38}O_{7}
Molar mass	486.605 g·mol^{−1}
Appearance	Odorless and colorless
Melting point	50 to 60 °C (122 to 140 °F; 323 to 333 K)

Hazards
NFPA 704 (fire diamond)	4 0 0
- Except where otherwise noted, data are given for materials in their standard state (at 25 °C [77 °F], 100 kPa). verify (what is ?) Infobox references

Bongkrek acid (also known as bongkrekic acid) is a respiratory toxin produced in fermented coconut or maize contaminated by the bacterium Burkholderia gladioli pathovar cocovenenans. It is a highly toxic, heat-stable, colorless, odorless, and highly unsaturated tricarboxylic acid that inhibits the mitochondrial ADP/ATP carrier, preventing ATP from leaving the mitochondria to provide metabolic energy to the rest of the cell. Food poisoning by bongkrek acid mainly targets the liver, brain, and kidneys. Early symptoms include vomiting, diarrhea, urinary retention, abdominal pain, and excessive sweating. Most of the outbreaks are found in Indonesia and China where fermented coconut and maize-based foods are consumed.

== Discovery and history ==
Tempe bongkrek, a traditional Indonesian staple foodstuff, served as a main source of protein in Java for centuries due to it being cheap and widely available. It is made by forming coconut meat, which is a by-product from coconut milk production, into a cake which is then fermented with Rhizopus oligosporus mold.

The first outbreak of bongkrek poisoning was recorded by Dutch researchers in 1895, following a food poisoning outbreak in Java, Indonesia. For unclear reasons, no further research was conducted to find its cause.

During the early 1930s, however, Indonesia went into economic depression, which caused some people to make their staple foodstuffs (including tempe bongkrek) themselves instead of buying it from well-trained producers. As a result, tempe bongkrek food poisonings occurred more frequently, up to 12 cases a year. Dutch scientists W.K. Mertens and A.G. van Veen from the Eijkman Institute in Jakarta, set out to identify the cause of the poisoning epidemic. They successfully identified its source as a bacterium called Burkholderia cocovenenans (formerly known as Pseudomonas cocovenenans), which turned out to produce a toxin subsequently named bongkrek acid. The bacterium is commonly found in the soil, and can end up in plants (and their derived foodstuffs like coconuts and maize) as well. Fermenting such contaminated foodstuffs may lead to the formation of bongkrek acid in the fermented product.

Since 1975, consumption of contaminated tempe bongkrek has caused more than 3000 cases of bongkrek acid poisoning. The production of tempe bongkrek has been banned since 1988.

== Synthesis ==
The first total synthesis of bongkrek acid was carried out by E.J. Corey in 1984. Since then, there have been multiple attempts to optimize its synthesis using different numbers of fragments, the most notable of which are by Shindo of Kyushu University (2009, three fragments) and Lev (2010).

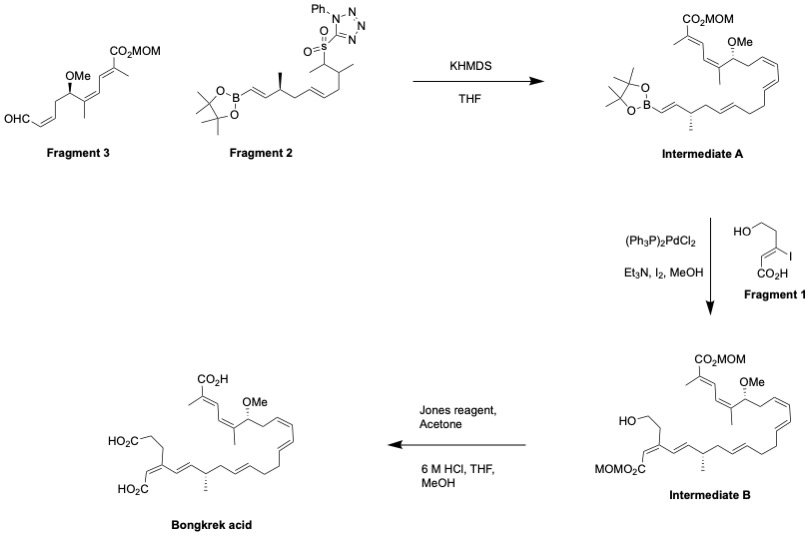
Bongkrek acid synthesis by Shindo's group in 2009

== Mechanism of action ==
Mitochondrial synthesis of ATP requires ADP transport from the cytosol into the mitochondrial matrix through the adenine nucleotide translocator (ANT). Bongkrek acid binds to the surface of the ANT, inhibiting its translocation and blocking active transport of cytosolic ADP into the mitochondrion. The binding of bongkrek acid to the ANT, and therefore also its inhibition, are irreversible.

== Symptoms of poisoning ==
After consumption of bongkrek acid-contaminated food, the latency period is between 1 and 10 hours. Common symptoms of bongkrek acid poisoning are dizziness, somnolence, excessive sweating, palpitations, abdominal pain, vomiting, diarrhea, hematochezia (fresh blood in the stool), hematuria (blood in the urine), urinary retention, and limb soreness. In the first reported case in Africa, 12 out of 17 people were reported to have limb soreness as one of their main symptoms.

In Indonesia the overall reported mortality rate is reported to be 60%, while in Mozambique it is reported to be 32%. Incidents in China have had a range of overall reported mortality rates, leading researchers to suggest that different starches contaminated by bongkrek acid may have different mortality rates. Fatal dose has been reported to be as low as 1 to 1.5 mg single dose, but oral LD_{50} has also been reported at a significantly higher dose of 3.16 mg/kg body weight. Death usually occurs 1 to 20 hours after the onset of symptoms.

== Treatment ==
There are no specific treatment modalities or antidotes available for bongkrek acid poisoning, and treatment is therefore symptomatic. Decreasing systemic uptake of bongkrek acid in the GI tract may be attempted (by administration of activated charcoal, for example). Timing is critical to reverse severe physiological effects.
