= Toxoflavin =

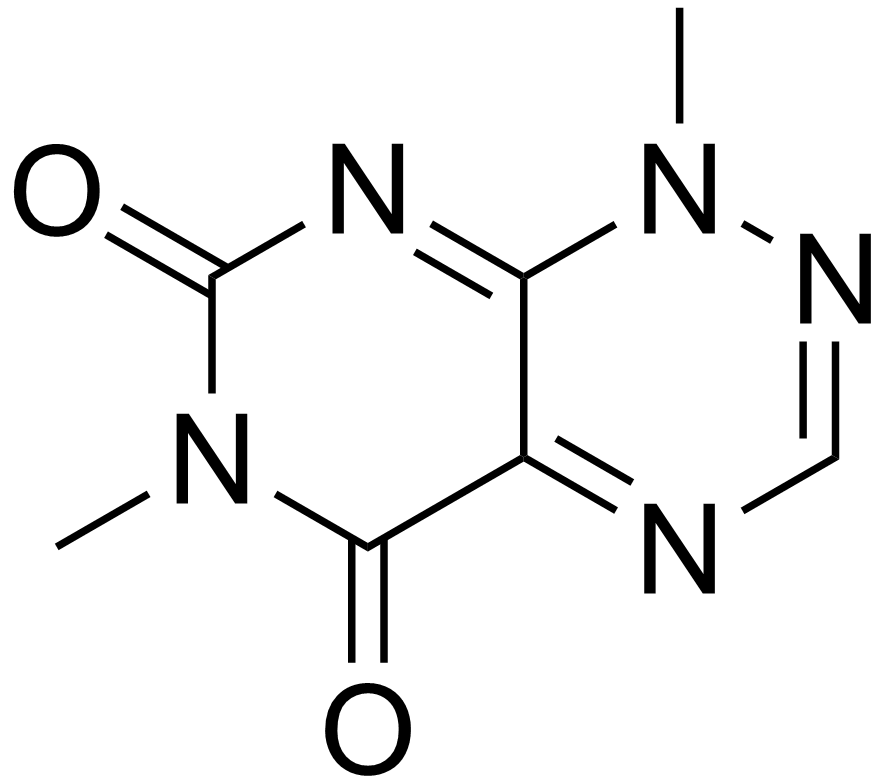

Names
- IUPAC name 1,6-Dimethylpyrimido[5,4-e][1,2,4]triazine-5,7(1H,6H)-dione
- Other names Toxoflavine; Xanthothricin; Xanthotricin

Identifiers
CAS Number	84-82-2
3D model (JSmol)	Interactive image
ChEBI	CHEBI:80729
ChEMBL	ChEMBL578512
ChemSpider	59912
ECHA InfoCard	100.213.079
PubChem CID	66541
UNII	5N5YI4IP1P
CompTox Dashboard (EPA)	DTXSID00861658
- InChI: InChI=1S/C7H7N5O2/c1-11-6(13)4-5(10-7(11)14)12(2)9-3-8-4/h3H,1-2H3 Key: SLGRAIAQIAUZAQ-UHFFFAOYSA-N; InChI=1S/C7H7N5O2/c1-11-6(13)4-5(10-7(11)14)12(2)9-3-8-4/h3H,1-2H3
- SMILES: O=C2\N=C1C(=N/C=N\N1C)\C(=O)N2C

Properties
Chemical formula	C_{7}H_{7}N_{5}O_{2}
Molar mass	193.166 g·mol^{−1}
Appearance	Bright yellow solid
Melting point	172 to 173 °C (342 to 343 °F; 445 to 446 K) (decomposes)

Hazards
- GHS labelling
Pictograms	(GHS06: Toxic)
Signal word	Danger
Hazard statements	H300
Precautionary statements	P264, P270, P301+P316, P321, P330, P405, P501
- Lethal dose or concentration (LD, LC)
LD_{50} (median dose)	1.7 mg/kg (IV, mouse); 8.4 mg/kg (oral, mouse)
- Except where otherwise noted, data are given for materials in their standard state (at 25 °C [77 °F], 100 kPa). verify (what is ?) Infobox references

Toxoflavin is a toxin produced by a variety of bacteria including Burkholderia gladioli. It also has antibiotic properties.

Toxoflavin acts as a pH indicator, changing between yellow and colorless at pH 10.5.
