= Renal tubular transport inhibitor =

- Drug class

Class identifiers
- Use: Treatment of gout, reduced clearance of co-administered drugs
- Mechanism of action: Transporter inhibitor
- Biological target: OAT1, OAT3, OCT2, MATE1 and MATE2

Legal status

Renal tubular transport inhibitors are a class of drugs that interfere with the function of specific transporters in the renal proximal tubules, affecting the excretion and reabsorption of various substances, including drugs and endogenous compounds. These inhibitors target membrane transport proteins expressed in kidney tubule epithelial cells, which play a crucial role in drug elimination and can significantly influence drug pharmacokinetics. By modulating the activity of transporters such as organic anion transporters (OATs), organic cation transporters (OCTs), and multidrug and toxin extrusion proteins (MATEs), these inhibitors can alter the renal clearance of drugs, potentially leading to clinically significant drug–drug interactions (DDIs) and changes in drug efficacy or toxicity. Renal tubular transport inhibitors have both therapeutic applications, such as enhancing the efficacy of certain medications or reducing drug-induced nephrotoxicity, and potential risks, including unwanted drug accumulation and altered pharmacokinetics of co-administered drugs.

== Targeted transporters ==
The main transporter proteins targeted by renal tubular transport inhibitors are:

=== Organic anion transporters ===
Organic anion transporters (OATs) are primarily expressed on the basolateral membrane of renal tubular cells and are responsible for the uptake of anionic drugs from the blood into the cells. OAT1 and OAT3 are the major OATs involved in drug transport in the kidney. OAT4 is located on the apical membrane, it plays a role in both secretion and reabsorption of compounds.

=== Organic cation transporters ===
Organic cation transporters (OCTs) are involved in the transport of cationic drugs across renal tubular cell membranes. OCT2 is located on the basolateral membrane and mediates the first step in organic cation secretion in the kidney.

=== Multidrug and toxin extrusion proteins ===
Multidrug and toxin extrusion proteins (MATEs) are expressed on the apical membrane of renal tubular cells and are responsible for the efflux of some drugs into the urine. MATE1 and MATE2 transporters work in conjunction with OCT2 to facilitate the secretion of cationic drugs.

== Approved drugs ==
Examples of approved drugs that act as renal tubular transport inhibitors include:

- Probenecid: This is an inhibitor of the organic anion transport system, particularly OAT1 and OAT3. It is used clinically to increase the systemic concentrations of certain drugs by reducing their renal excretion.
- Cimetidine: A histamine H2 receptor antagonist that inhibits the organic cation transport system, particularly OCT2. It can affect the pharmacokinetics of other cationic drugs.
- Lesinurad: This drug inhibits URAT1 (Urate Transporter 1) in the proximal tubule, providing uricosuric activity for the treatment of gout.
- Pyrazinamide: Used in tuberculosis treatment, it inhibits URAT1 and other uric acid transporters, affecting uric acid excretion.
- Benzbromarone: Another uricosuric agent that inhibits URAT1 and other uric acid transporters.

These inhibitors can be used therapeutically to alter drug pharmacokinetics, reduce drug-induced nephrotoxicity, or treat specific conditions like hyperuricemia. However, they can also lead to clinically significant drug–drug interactions by affecting the renal clearance of other medications.
