= CPS operon =

The capsule biosynthesis, or CPS operon, is a section of the genome present in some Escherichia coli, of which regulates the production of polysaccharides making up the bacterial capsule. These polysaccharides help protect the bacteria from harsh environments, toxic chemicals, and bacteriophages.

The CPS operon contains genes which code for the following proteins:

- Wza - a lipoprotein which may form a channel in the bacterial outer membrane.
- Wzb - a cytoplasmic regulatory phosphatase which dephosphorylates Wzc.
- Wzc - a tyrosine kinase found in the bacterial inner membrane. Participates in polymerization of capsule polysaccharides.
- Wzx - Transfers new polysaccharide units across the inner membrane.
- Wzy - Assembles longer polysaccharide chains using units introduced by Wzx.

The CPS operon is likely transcriptionally regulated by the Rcs (regulation of capsule synthesis) proteins. Reduced levels of membrane-derived oligosaccharides result in autophosphorylation of RcsC. This results in a phosphate group being transferred from RcsC to RcsB. RcsB then binds to RcsA, forming a complex which acts on the CPS promoter and activates transcription of the CPS genes.

The same operon is present in Klebsiella species, possibly as a result of horizontal gene transfer.
