= Multi-antimicrobial extrusion protein =

Multi antimicrobial extrusion protein

Identifiers
- Symbol: MatE
- Pfam: PF01554
- Pfam clan: CL0222
- InterPro: IPR002528
- TCDB: 2.A.66
- OPM superfamily: 220
- OPM protein: 3mkt
Available protein structures:
- PDB: IPR002528 PF01554 (ECOD; PDBsum)
- AlphaFold: IPR002528; PF01554

Multi-antimicrobial extrusion protein (MATE) also known as multidrug and toxin extrusion or multidrug and toxic compound extrusion is a family of proteins which function as drug/sodium or proton antiporters.

== Function ==
The MATE proteins in bacteria, archaea and eukaryotes function as fundamental transporters of metabolic and xenobiotic organic cations.

== Structure ==
These proteins are predicted to have 12 alpha-helical transmembrane regions, some of the animal proteins may have an additional C-terminal helix. The X-ray structure of the NorM was determined to 3.65 Å, revealing an outward-facing conformation with two portals open to the outer leaflet of the membrane and a unique topology of the predicted 12 transmembrane helices distinct from any other known multidrug resistance transporter.

== Discovery ==
The multidrug efflux transporter NorM from V. parahaemolyticus which mediates resistance to multiple antimicrobial agents (norfloxacin, kanamycin, ethidium bromide etc.) and its homologue from E. coli were identified in 1998. NorM seems to function as drug/sodium antiporter which is the first example of Na^{+}-coupled multidrug efflux transporter discovered. NorM is a prototype of a new transporter family and Brown et al. named it the multidrug and toxic compound extrusion family. NorM is nicknamed "Last of the multidrug transporters" because it is the last multidrug transporter discovered functionally as well as structurally.

== Genes ==
The following human genes encode MATE proteins:

- SLC47A1
- SLC47A2

== See also ==
- Solute carrier family
- Resistance-Nodulation-Cell Division Superfamily (RND)
