= Phosphate-selective porin =

Family of proteins

Porin_O_P

Identifiers
- Symbol: Porin_O_P
- Pfam: PF07396
- Pfam clan: CL0193
- InterPro: IPR010870
- TCDB: 1.B.5
- OPM superfamily: 31
- OPM protein: 2o4v
Available protein structures:
- PDB: IPR010870 PF07396 (ECOD; PDBsum)
- AlphaFold: IPR010870; PF07396

Phosphate-selective porins are a family of outer bacterial membrane proteins. These are anion-specific porins, the binding site of which has a higher affinity for phosphate than chloride ions. Porin O has a higher affinity for polyphosphates, while porin P has a higher affinity for orthophosphate. In Pseudomonas aeruginosa, porin O was found to be expressed only under phosphate-starvation conditions during the stationary growth phase.
