= Multidrug and toxin extrusion protein 2 =

Protein-coding gene in the species Homo sapiens

SLC47A2

Identifiers
- Aliases: SLC47A2, MATE2, MATE2-B, MATE2-K, MATE2K, solute carrier family 47 member 2
- External IDs: OMIM: 609833; GeneCards: SLC47A2

Gene location (Human)
Chr.	Chromosome 17 (human)
Band	17p11.2	Start	19,678,288 bp
Band	17p11.2	End	19,718,979 bp
RNA expression pattern
Bgee	Human / Mouse (ortholog); Top expressed in: right uterine tube; gums; caput epididymis; human kidney; gingival epithelium; skin of limb; skin of leg; skin of abdomen; hypothalamus; C1 segment / n/a; More reference expression data
BioGPS	n/a
Gene ontology
Molecular function	antiporter activity; xenobiotic transmembrane transporter activity
Cellular component	integral component of membrane; plasma membrane; membrane
Biological process	transmembrane transport; xenobiotic export; xenobiotic transmembrane transport; xenobiotic transport
Sources:Amigo / QuickGO
Orthologs
Databases	NCBI: entry; OMA: entry
Species	Human	Mouse
Entrez	146802	n/a
Ensembl	ENSG00000180638	n/a
UniProt	Q86VL8	n/a
RefSeq (mRNA)	NM_001099646; NM_001256663; NM_152908	n/a
RefSeq (protein)	NP_001093116; NP_001243592; NP_690872	n/a
Location (UCSC)	Chr 17: 19.68 – 19.72 Mb	n/a
PubMed search		n/a
- Wikidata
View/Edit Human

Multidrug and toxin extrusion protein 2 is a protein which in humans is encoded by the SLC47A2 gene.

== Function ==
This gene encodes a protein belonging to a family of transporters involved in the excretion of both endogenous and exogenous toxic electrolytes through urine and bile. This transporter family shares homology with the bacterial MATE (multi antimicrobial extrusion protein or multidrug and toxic compound extrusion) protein family responsible for drug resistance. This gene is one of two members of the MATE transporter family located near each other on chromosome 17. Alternatively, spliced transcript variants encoding different isoforms have been identified for this gene.

== Discovery ==
The multidrug efflux transporter NorM from V. parahaemolyticus, which mediates resistance to multiple antimicrobial agents (norfloxacin, kanamycin, ethidium bromide etc.), and its homologue from E. coli were identified in 1998. NorM seems to function as a drug/sodium antiporter, which is the first example of Na^{+}-coupled multidrug efflux transporter discovered. NorM is a prototype of a new transporter family, and Brown et al. named it the multidrug and toxic compound extrusion family. The X-ray structure of the NorM was determined to be 3.65 Å, revealing an outward-facing conformation with two portals open to the outer leaflet of the membrane and a unique topology of the predicted 12 transmembrane helices distinct from any other known multidrug resistance transporter.
