= Oligogalacturonate-specific porin =

KdgM

Identifiers
- Symbol: KdgM
- Pfam: PF06178
- Pfam clan: CL0193
- InterPro: IPR009331
- TCDB: 1.B.35
- OPM superfamily: 206
- OPM protein: 2wjr
Available protein structures:
- PDB: IPR009331 PF06178 (ECOD; PDBsum)
- AlphaFold: IPR009331; PF06178

Oligogalacturonate-specific porins (KdgM) are a family of outer bacterial membrane proteins from Dickeya dadantii. The phytopathogenic Gram-negative bacteria D. dadantii secretes pectinases, which are able to degrade the pectic polymers of plant cell walls, and uses the degradation products as a carbon source for growth. Synthesis of KdgM is strongly induced in the presence of pectic derivatives. KdgM behaves like a voltage-dependent porin that is slightly selective for anions and that exhibits fast block in the presence of trigalacturonate. KdgM seems to be monomeric.
