= Porin (protein) =

Group of transport proteins

Gram-negative porin
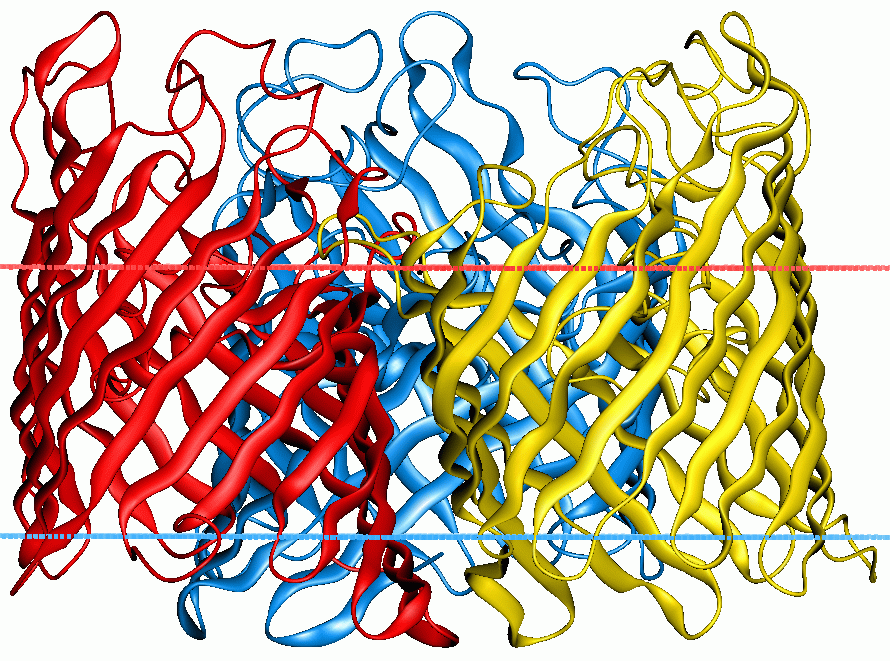

Identifiers
- Symbol: Porin_08134891516
- Pfam: PF00267
- Pfam clan: CL0193
- InterPro: IPR001702
- PROSITE: PDOC00498
- SCOP2: 1mpf / SCOPe / SUPFAM
- TCDB: 1.B.1
- OPM superfamily: 31
- OPM protein: 1pho
- CDD: cd01345
Available protein structures:
- PDB: IPR001702 PF00267 (ECOD; PDBsum)
- AlphaFold: IPR001702; PF00267

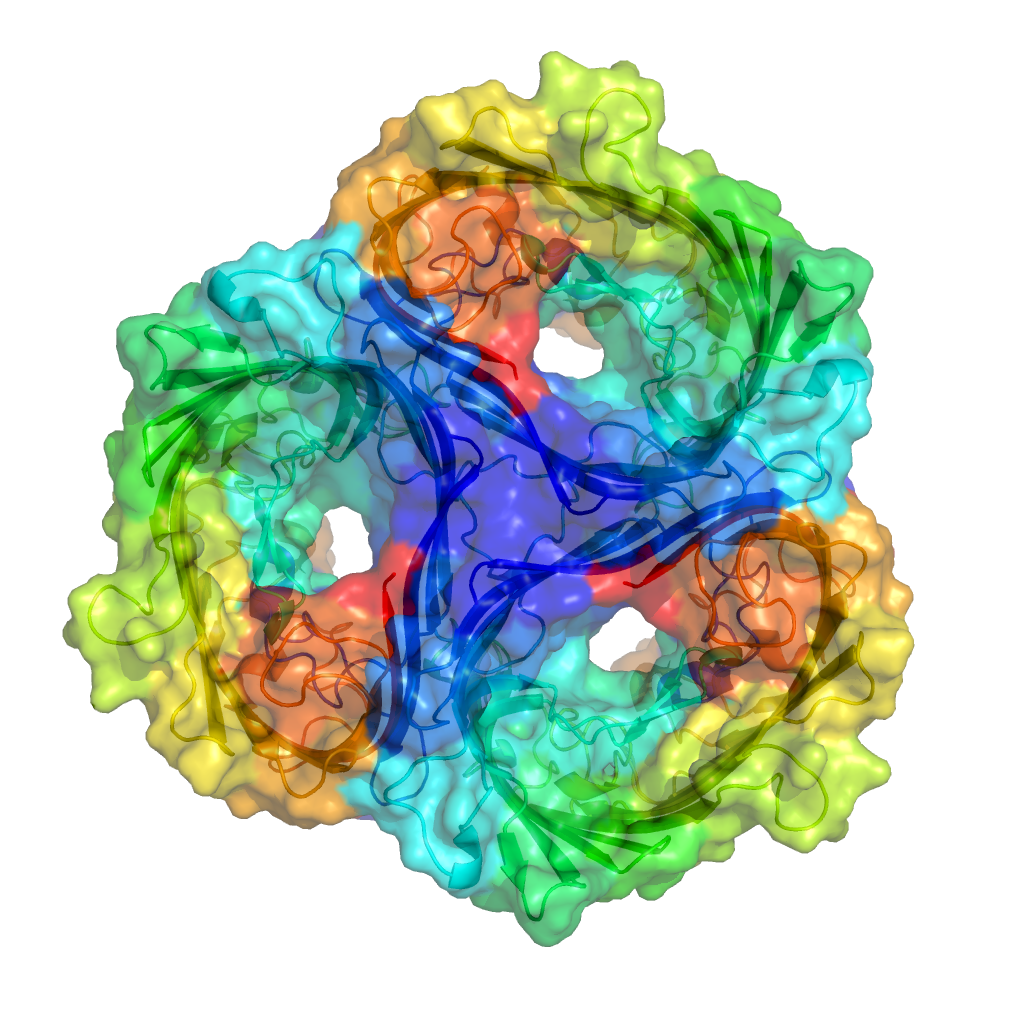
A sucrose specific porin from Salmonella typhimurium, a Gram-negative bacterium. PDB: 1A0S

Porins are beta barrel proteins that cross a cellular membrane and act as a pore, through which molecules can diffuse. Unlike other membrane transport proteins, porins are large enough to allow passive diffusion, i.e., they act as channels that are specific to different types of molecules. They are present in the outer membrane of Gram-negative bacteria and some Gram-positive mycobacteria (mycolic acid-containing actinomycetes), the outer membrane of mitochondria, and the outer chloroplast membrane (outer plastid membrane).

== Structure ==
Porins are composed of beta sheets (β sheets) made up of beta strands (β strands) which are linked together by beta turns (β turns) on the cytoplasmic side and long loops of amino acids on the other. The β strands lie in an antiparallel fashion and form a cylindrical tube, called a beta barrel (β barrel). The amino acid composition of the porin β strands are unique in that polar and nonpolar residues alternate along them. This means that the nonpolar residues face outward so as to interact with the nonpolar lipids of outer membrane, whereas the polar residues face inwards into the center of the beta barrel to create the aqueous channel. The specific amino acids in the channel determine the specificity of the porin to different molecules.

The β barrels that make up a porin are composed of as few as eight β strands to as many as twenty-two β strands. The individual strands are joined together by loops and turns. The majority of porins are monomers; however, some dimeric porins have been discovered, as well as an octameric porin. Depending on the size of the porin, the interior of the protein may either be filled with water, have up to two β strands folded back into the interior, or contain a "stopper" segment composed of β strands.

All porins form homotrimers in the outer membrane, meaning that three identical porin subunits associate together to form a porin super-structure with three channels. Hydrogen bonding and dipole-dipole interactions between each monomer in the homotrimer ensure that they do not dissociate, and remain together in the outer membrane.

Several parameters have been used to describe the structure of a porin protein. They include the tilting angle (α), shear number (S), strand number (n), and barrel radius (R). The tilting angle refers to the angle relative to the membrane. The shear number (S) is the number of amino acid residues found in each β strands. Strand number (n) is the number of β strands in the porin, and barrel radius (R) refers to the radius of the opening of the porin. These parameters are related via the following formulas:

$$2 \pi R = \frac{nb}{2 \cos( \alpha )}$$

and,

$$\tan(\alpha) = \frac{S a}{nb}$$

Using these formulas, the structure of a porin can be determined by knowing only a few of the available parameters. While the structure of many porins have been determined using X-ray crystallography, the alternative method of sequencing protein primary structure may also be used instead.

== Cellular roles ==
Porins are water-filled pores and channels found in the membranes of bacteria and eukaryotes. Porin-like channels have also been discovered in archaea. Note that the term "nucleoporin" refers to unrelated proteins that facilitate transport through nuclear pores in the nuclear envelope.

Porins are primarily involved in passively transporting hydrophilic molecules of various sizes and charges across the membrane. For survival, certain required nutrients and substrates must be transported into the cells. Likewise, toxins and wastes must be transported out to avoid toxic accumulation. Additionally, porins can regulate permeability and prevent lysis by limiting the entry of detergents into the cell.

Two types of porins exist to transport different materials– general and selective. General porins have no substrate specificities, though some exhibit slight preferences for anions or cations. Selective porins are smaller than general porins, and have specificities for chemical species. These specificities are determined by the threshold sizes of the porins, and the amino acid residues lining them.

In Gram-negative bacteria, the inner membrane is the major permeability barrier. The outer membrane is more permeable to hydrophilic substances, due to the presence of porins. Porins have threshold sizes of transportable molecules that depend on the type of bacteria and porin. Generally, only substances less than 600 daltons in size can diffuse through.

== Diversity ==
Porins were first discovered in Gram-negative bacteria, but Gram-positive bacteria with both types of porins have been found. They exhibit similar transport functions but have a more limited variety of porins, compared to the distribution found in Gram-negative bacteria. Gram-positive bacteria lack outer membranes, so these porin channels are instead bound to specific lipids within the cell walls.

Porins are also found in eukaryotes, specifically in the outer membranes of mitochondria and chloroplasts. The organelles contain general porins that are structurally and functionally similar to bacterial ones. These similarities have supported the Endosymbiotic theory, through which eukaryotic organelles arose from Gram-negative bacteria. However, eukaryotic porins exhibit the same limited diversity as Gram-positive porins, and also display a greater voltage-dependent role during metabolism.

Archaea also contain ion channels that have originated from general porins. The channels are found in the cell envelope and help facilitate solute transfer. They have similar characteristics as bacterial and mitochondrial porins, indicating physiological overlaps over all three domains of life.

== Antibiotic resistance ==
Many porins are targets for host immune cells, resulting in signaling pathways that lead to bacterial degradation. Therapeutic treatments, like vaccinations and antibiotics, are used to supplement this immune response. Specific antibiotics have been designed to travel through porins in order to inhibit cellular processes.

However, due to selective pressure, bacteria can develop resistance through mutations in the porin gene. The mutations may lead to a loss of porins, resulting in the antibiotics having a lower permeability or being completely excluded from transport. These changes have contributed to the global emergence of antibiotic resistance, and an increase in mortality rates from infections.

== Discovery ==
The discovery of porins has been attributed to Hiroshi Nikaido, nicknamed "the porinologist."

== Classification ==
According to TCDB, there are five evolutionarily independent superfamilies of porins. Porin superfamily I includes 47 families of porins with a range of numbers of trans-membrane β-strands (β-TMS). These include the GBP, SP and RPP porin families. While PSF I includes 47 families, PSF II-V each contain only 2 families. While PSF I derives members from Gram-negative bacteria primarily one family of eukaryotic mitochondrial porins, PSF II and V porins are derived from Actinomycetota. PSF III and V are derived from eukaryotic organelle.

=== Porin Superfamily I ===
1.B.1 - The General bacterial porin family
1.B.2 - The Chlamydial Porin (CP) Family
1.B.3 - The Sugar porin (SP) Family
1.B.4 - The Brucella-Rhizobium porin (BRP) Family
1.B.5 - The Pseudomonas OprP Porin (POP) Family
1.B.6 - OmpA-OmpF porin (OOP) family
1.B.7 Rhodobacter PorCa porin (RPP) family
1.B.8 Mitochondrial and plastid porin (MPP) family
1.B.9 FadL outer membrane protein (FadL) family
1.B.10 Nucleoside-specific channel-forming outer membrane porin (Tsx) family
1.B.11 Outer membrane fimbrial usher porin (FUP) family
1.B.12 Autotransporter-1 (AT-1) family
1.B.13 Alginate export porin (AEP) family
1.B.14 Outer membrane receptor (OMR) family
1.B.15 Raffinose porin (RafY) family
1.B.16 Short chain amide and urea porin (SAP) family
1.B.17 Outer membrane factor (OMF) family
1.B.18 Outer membrane auxiliary (OMA) protein family
1.B.19 Glucose-selective OprB porin (OprB) family
1.B.20 Two-partner secretion (TPS) family
1.B.21 OmpG porin (OmpG) family
1.B.22 Outer bacterial membrane secretin (secretin) family
1.B.23 Cyanobacterial porin (CBP) family
1.B.24 Mycobacterial porin
1.B.25 Outer membrane porin (Opr) family
1.B.26 Cyclodextrin porin (CDP) family
1.B.31 Campylobacter jejuni major outer membrane porin (MomP) family
1.B.32 Fusobacterial outer membrane porin (FomP) family
1.B.33 Outer membrane protein insertion porin (Bam complex) (OmpIP) family
1.B.34 Corynebacterial porins
1.B.35 Oligogalacturonate-specific porin (KdgM) family
1.B.39 Bacterial porin, OmpW (OmpW) family
1.B.42 - The Outer Membrane Lipopolysaccharide Export Porin (LPS-EP) Family
1.B.43 - The Coxiella Porin P1 (CPP1) Family
1.B.44 - The Probable Protein Translocating Porphyromonas gingivalis Porin (PorT) Family
1.B.49 - The Anaplasma P44 (A-P44) Porin Family
1.B.54 - Intimin/Invasin (Int/Inv) or Autotransporter-3 family
1.B.55 - The Poly Acetyl Glucosamine Porin (PgaA) Family
1.B.57 - The Legionella Major-Outer Membrane Protein (LM-OMP) Family
1.B.60 - The Omp50 Porin (Omp50 Porin) Family
1.B.61 - The Delta-Proteobacterial Porin (Delta-Porin) Family
1.B.62 - The Putative Bacterial Porin (PBP) Family
1.B.66 - The Putative Beta-Barrel Porin-2 (BBP2) Family
1.B.67 - The Putative Beta Barrel Porin-4 (BBP4) Family
1.B.68 - The Putative Beta Barrel Porin-5 (BBP5) Superfamily
1.B.70 - The Outer Membrane Channel (OMC) Family
1.B.71 - The Proteobacterial/Verrucomicrobial Porin (PVP) Family
1.B.72 - The Protochlamydial Outer Membrane Porin (PomS/T) Family
1.B.73 - The Capsule Biogenesis/Assembly (CBA) Family
1.B.78 - The DUF3374 Electron Transport-associated Porin (ETPorin) Family

=== Porin Superfamily II (MspA Superfamily) ===
1.B.24 - Mycobacterial porin
1.B.58 - Nocardial Hetero-oligomeric Cell Wall Channel (NfpA/B) Family

=== Porin Superfamily III ===
1.B.28 - The Plastid Outer Envelope Porin of 24 kDa (OEP24) Family
1.B.47 - The Plastid Outer Envelope Porin of 37 kDa (OEP37) Family

=== Porin Superfamily IV (Tim17/OEP16/PxMPL (TOP) Superfamily) ===
This superfamily includes protein that comprise pores in multicomponent protein translocases as follows: 3.A.8 - [Tim17 (P39515) Tim22 (Q12328) Tim23 (P32897)]; 1.B.69 - [PXMP4 (Q9Y6I8) PMP24 (A2R8R0)]; 3.D.9 - [NDH 21.3 kDa component (P25710)]

1.B.30 - The Plastid Outer Envelope Porin of 16 kDa (OEP16) Family
1.B.69 - The Peroxysomal Membrane Porin 4 (PxMP4) Family
3.A.8 - The Mitochondrial Protein Translocase (MPT) Family

=== Porin Superfamily V (Corynebacterial PorA/PorH Superfamily) ===
1.B.34 - The Corynebacterial Porin A (PorA) Family 1.B.59 - The Outer Membrane Porin, PorH (PorH) Family

== See also ==
- Voltage-dependent anion channel
- Aquaporin
