= Sulopenem/probenecid =

Combination medication

- Sulopenem etzadroxil

- Probenecid

Combination of
- Sulopenem: Penem antibacterial
- Probenecid: Renal tubular transport inhibitor

Clinical data
- Trade names: Orlynvah
- License data: US DailyMed: Sulopenem and probenecid
- Routes of administration: By mouth
- ATC code: None

Legal status
- Legal status: US: ℞-only

Identifiers
- KEGG: D12976

Sulopenem/probenecid, sold under the brand name Orlynvah, is a fixed-dose combination medication used for the treatment of urinary tract infections. It contains sulopenem, a penem antibacterial, as the prodrug sulopenem etzadroxil; and probenecid, a renal tubular transport inhibitor.

The most common side effects include diarrhea, nausea, vaginal yeast infection, headache, and vomiting.

The combination was approved for medical use in the United States in October 2024.

== Medical uses ==
Sulopenem/probenecid is indicated for the treatment of uncomplicated urinary tract infections caused by the designated microorganisms Escherichia coli, Klebsiella pneumoniae, or Proteus mirabilis in adult women who have limited or no alternative oral antibacterial treatment options.

== Contraindications ==
Sulopenem/probenecid is contraindicated in people with a history of hypersensitivity reactions to sulopenem etzadroxil or probenecid or other beta-lactam antibacterial drugs; people with known blood dyscrasias; people with known uric acid kidney stones; and people who are also taking ketorolac tromethamine.

== Adverse effects ==
The US Food and Drug Administration (FDA) prescribing information for sulopenem/probenecid includes warnings for hypersensitivity reactions, Clostridioides difficile-associated diarrhea, and potential exacerbation of gout when given to people with a known history of gout.

== History ==
The effectiveness of sulopenem/probenecid was evaluated in two phase III controlled, randomized, double blind clinical trials (trial 1 and trial 2) which enrolled adult women with uncomplicated urinary tract infections. Trial 1 (NCT05584657) was a noninferiority trial in which 2214 adult women with uncomplicated urinary tract infections were randomized and treated. Sulopenem/probenecid demonstrated efficacy in participants with amoxicillin/clavulanate-susceptible pathogens with a composite response rate (combined microbiological response and clinical response) of 62% compared to a composite response rate of 55% in the amoxicillin/clavulanate group. Trial 2 (NCT03354598) was a noninferiority trial in which 1660 adult women with uncomplicated urinary tract infections were randomized and treated. Sulopenem/probenecid demonstrated efficacy in participants with ciprofloxacin-resistant pathogens with a composite response rate of 48% compared to a composite response rate of 33% in the ciprofloxacin group. Overall, in the two trials combined, 1932 participants were treated with sulopenem/probenecid. Clinical trials evaluating sulopenem/probenecid for the treatment of participants with complicated urinary tract infections and complicated intra-abdominal infections did not demonstrate effectiveness.
