= Mycobacterial porin =

Family of proteins

MspA
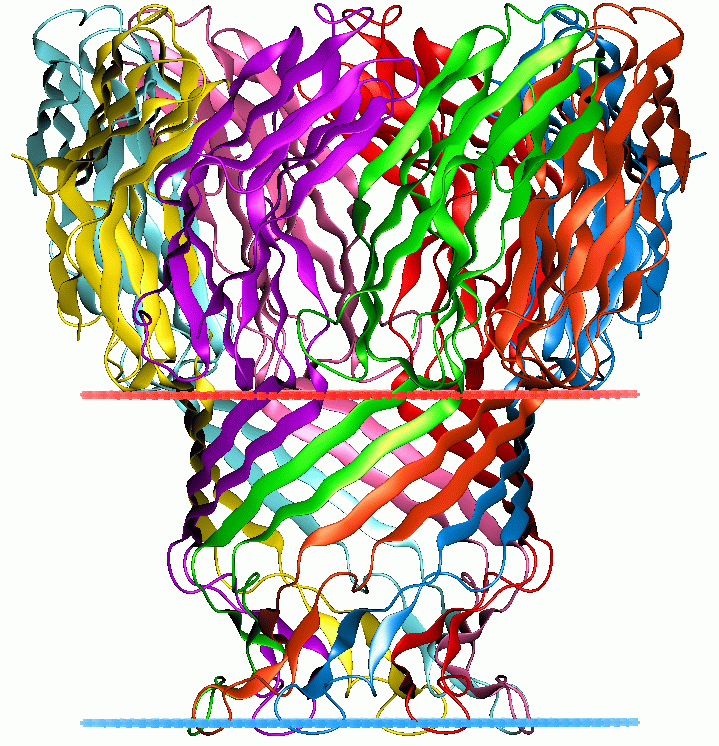

Identifiers
- Symbol: MspA
- Pfam: PF09203
- InterPro: IPR015286
- SCOP2: 1uun / SCOPe / SUPFAM
- TCDB: 1.B.24
- OPM superfamily: 268
- OPM protein: 1uun
Available protein structures:
- PDB: IPR015286 PF09203 (ECOD; PDBsum)
- AlphaFold: IPR015286; PF09203

Mycobacterial porins are a group of transmembrane beta-barrel proteins produced by mycobacteria, which allow hydrophilic nutrients to enter the bacterium. They are located in the impermeable mycobacterial outer membrane, or mycomembrane of fast-growing mycobacteria. The mycomembrane is unique and composed of very-long chain fatty acids, mycolic acids. These proteins are structurally different from the typical porins located in the outer membrane of Gram-negative bacteria. For example, the MspA protein forms a tightly interconnected octamer with eight-fold rotation symmetry that resembles a goblet and contains a central channel. Each protein subunit contains a beta-sandwich of immunoglobulin-like topology and a beta-ribbon arm that forms an oligomeric transmembrane beta-barrel.

MspA has biotechnological applications, most notably in nanopore sequencing.
