= Multidrug and toxin extrusion protein 1 =

Protein-coding gene in the species Homo sapiens

SLC47A1

Identifiers
- Aliases: SLC47A1, MATE1, solute carrier family 47 member 1
- External IDs: OMIM: 609832; MGI: 1914723; GeneCards: SLC47A1

Gene location (Human)
Chr.	Chromosome 17 (human)
Band	17p11.2	Start	19,495,385 bp
Band	17p11.2	End	19,579,034 bp

Gene location (Mouse)
Chr.	Chromosome 11 (mouse)
Band	11|11 B2	Start	61,234,227 bp
Band	11|11 B2	End	61,269,171 bp
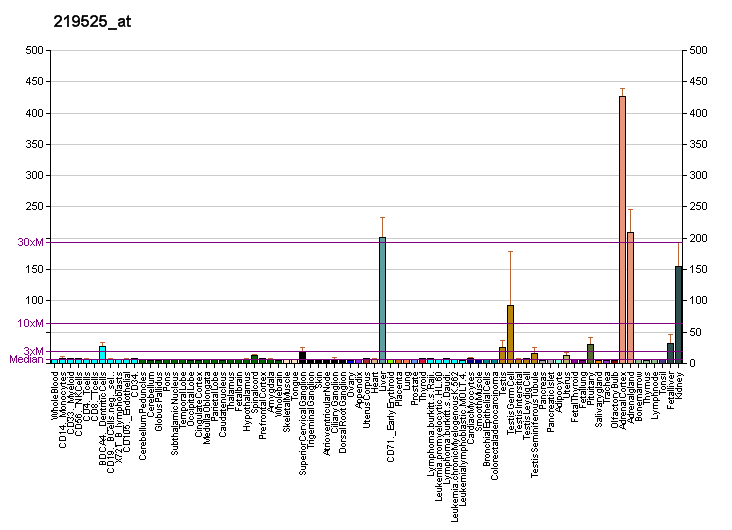
RNA expression pattern
Bgee	Human / Mouse (ortholog); Top expressed in: right adrenal cortex; kidney tubule; left adrenal cortex; glomerulus; metanephric glomerulus; right lobe of liver; human kidney; canal of the cervix; gastrocnemius muscle; gonad / Top expressed in: proximal tubule; right kidney; human kidney; left lobe of liver; lumbar spinal ganglion; interventricular septum; myocardium of ventricle; cardiac muscles; extraocular muscle; digastric muscle; More reference expression data
BioGPS	More reference expression data
Gene ontology
Molecular function	antiporter activity; monovalent cation:proton antiporter activity; xenobiotic transmembrane transporter activity
Cellular component	integral component of membrane; plasma membrane; membrane; vesicle
Biological process	proton transmembrane transport; transmembrane transport; xenobiotic export; xenobiotic transmembrane transport; organic cation transport; cation transport; xenobiotic transport
Sources:Amigo / QuickGO
Orthologs
Databases	NCBI: entry; OMA: entry
Species	Human	Mouse
Entrez	55244	67473
Ensembl	ENSG00000142494	ENSMUSG00000010122
UniProt	Q96FL8	Q8K0H1
RefSeq (mRNA)	NM_018242	NM_026183
RefSeq (protein)	NP_060712	NP_080459
Location (UCSC)	Chr 17: 19.5 – 19.58 Mb	Chr 11: 61.23 – 61.27 Mb
PubMed search
- Wikidata
View/Edit Human	View/Edit Mouse

Multidrug and toxin extrusion protein 1 (MATE1), also known as solute carrier family 47 member 1, is a protein that in humans is encoded by the SLC47A1 gene. SLC47A1 belongs to the MATE (multidrug and toxic compound extrusion) family of transporters that are found in bacteria, archaea and eukaryotes.

== Gene ==
The SLC47A1 gene is located within the Smith–Magenis syndrome region on chromosome 17.

== Function ==
SLC47A1 is a member of the MATE family of transporters that excrete endogenous and exogenous toxic electrolytes through urine and bile.

== Discovery ==
The multidrug efflux transporter NorM from V. parahaemolyticus which mediates resistance to multiple antimicrobial agents (norfloxacin, kanamycin, ethidium bromide etc.) and its homologue from E. coli were identified in 1998, which is the first of Solute carrier family 47 member. NorM seems to function as drug/sodium antiporter which is the first example of Na^{+}-coupled multidrug efflux transporter. NorM is a prototype of a new transporter family and Brown et al. named it the multidrug and toxic compound extrusion family. The X-ray structure of the transporter NorM was determined to 3.65 Å, revealing an outward-facing conformation with two portals open to the outer leaflet of the membrane and a unique topology of the predicted 12 transmembrane helices distinct from any other known multidrug resistance transporter.

== See also ==
- MATE (Multi antimicrobial extrusion protein or multidrug and toxic compound extrusion protein)
