= SBT =

SBT may refer to:

== In entertainment and media ==
- Sistema Brasileiro de Televisão (Brazilian Television System), a Brazilian TV network
- South Bend Tribune newspaper, and its associated broadcast stations:
  - WSBT (AM)
  - WSBT-TV
- Sym-Bionic Titan, an American animated series created by Genndy Tartakovsky for Cartoon Network

== In science, technology, and medicine ==
- sbt (software), source build tool for the Scala programming language
- 2-sec-Butyl-4,5-dihydrothiazole, a thiazoline ligand
- Small bowel transplantation, a transplant surgery
- Spontaneous breathing trial, abbreviation used in medical documents
- Session-based testing, a software test method combining accountability and exploratory testing

== Transport ==
- Sabetta International Airport, IATA code SBT
- Stourbridge Town railway station, West Midlands, England, National Rail station code SBT

== Other uses ==
- Scan-based trading, an inventory system
- Single-bullet theory, a theory on some aspects of John F. Kennedy's assassination
- Southern bluefin tuna, a species of tuna
- Special Boat Teams, a unit under U.S. Naval Special Warfare Command
- Staffordshire Bull Terrier, a breed of dog
- State Bank of Travancore, a bank in India
- Swedish Bikini Team, a group of American female models
- Sweetened beverage tax
- San Benedetto del Tronto, a city in Italy
