= Outer membrane porin D =

OprD

Identifiers
- Symbol: OprD
- Pfam: PF03573
- Pfam clan: CL0193
- InterPro: IPR005318
- MEROPS: S43
- TCDB: 1.B.25
- OPM superfamily: 182
- OPM protein: 2odj
Available protein structures:
- PDB: IPR005318 PF03573 (ECOD; PDBsum)
- AlphaFold: IPR005318; PF03573

Outer membrane porin D is a protein family containing bacterial outer membrane porins which are involved in transport of cationic amino acids, peptides, antibiotics and other compounds.

It was also described as having some serine protease activity. However many of these proteins are not peptidases and are classified as non-peptidase homologues as they either have been found experimentally to be without peptidase activity, or lack amino acid residues that are believed to be essential for the catalytic activity of peptidases in the S43 family.
