= Outer membrane polysaccharide transporter =

Poly_export

Identifiers
- Symbol: Poly_export
- Pfam: PF02563
- InterPro: IPR003715
- TCDB: 1.B.18
- OPM superfamily: 167
- OPM protein: 2j58
Available protein structures:
- PDB: IPR003715 PF02563 (ECOD; PDBsum)
- AlphaFold: IPR003715; PF02563

The extracellular polysaccharide colanic acid is produced by species of the family Enterobacteriaceae. In Escherichia coli strain K12 the colanic acid cluster comprises 19 genes. The wzx gene encodes a protein with multiple transmembrane segments that may function in export of the colanic acid repeat unit from the cytoplasm into the periplasm in a process analogous to O-unit export. The colanic acid gene clusters may be involved in the export of polysaccharide from the cell.
