= Corynebacterial porin B =

Bacterial proteins

PorB

Identifiers
- Symbol: PorB
- Pfam: PF11565
- InterPro: IPR021114
- TCDB: 1.B.34
- OPM superfamily: 190
- OPM protein: 2vql
Available protein structures:
- PDB: IPR021114 PF11565 (ECOD; PDBsum)
- AlphaFold: IPR021114; PF11565

Porins B and C are cell wall channel-forming proteins from Corynebacterium. Porin B from Corynebacterium glutamicum (Brevibacterium flavum) allows the exchange of material across the mycolic acid layer, which is the protective nonpolar barrier. Porin B has an alpha helical core structure consisting of four alpha-helices surrounding a nonpolar interior. There is a disulfide bridge between helices 1 and 4 to form a stable covalently bonded ring. The channel of PorB is oligomeric.
