= Opacity porins =

Opacity family porin protein
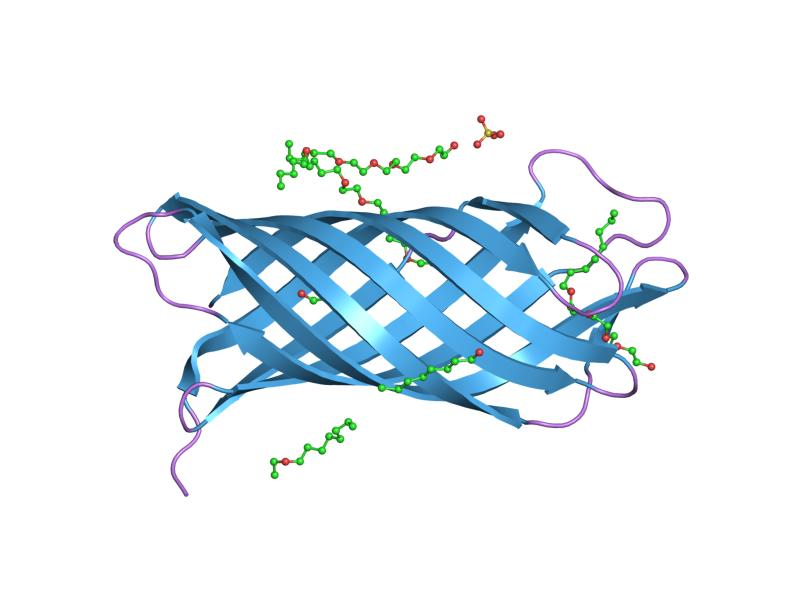
- Structure of Neisserial surface protein A (NspA).

Identifiers
- Symbol: Opacity
- Pfam: PF02462
- InterPro: IPR003394
- SCOP2: 1p4t / SCOPe / SUPFAM
- OPM superfamily: 235
- OPM protein: 1p4t
Available protein structures:
- PDB: IPR003394 PF02462 (ECOD; PDBsum)
- AlphaFold: IPR003394; PF02462

Opacity family porins are a family of porins from pathogenic Neisseria. These bacteria possess a repertoire of phase-variable opacity proteins that mediate various pathogen/host cell interactions. These proteins are related to OmpA-like transmembrane domain family.
