= Outer membrane protein G =

Outer membrane protein G (OmpG)
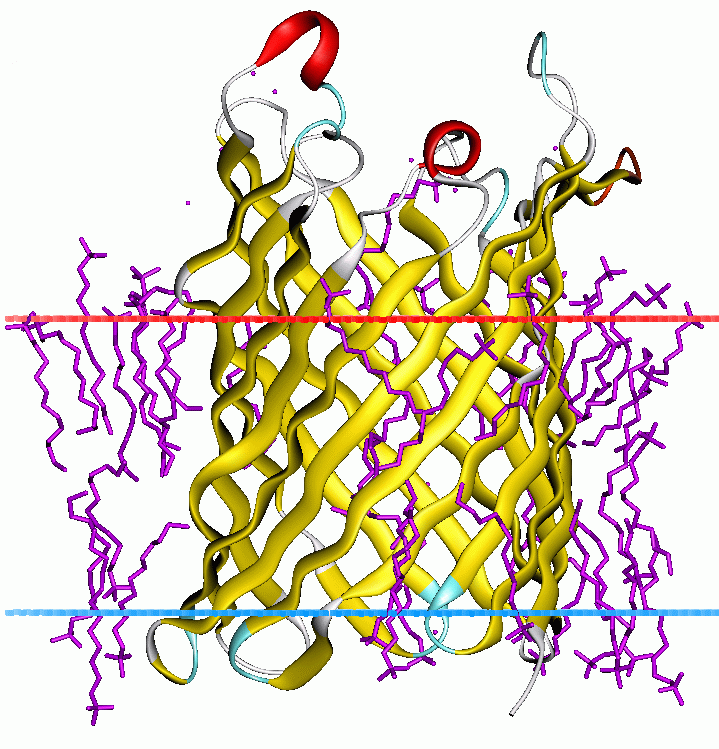

Identifiers
- Symbol: Porin_OmpG
- Pfam: PF09381
- SCOP2: 2iwv / SCOPe / SUPFAM
- TCDB: 1.B.21
- OPM superfamily: 102
- OPM protein: 2iwv
Available protein structures:
- PDB: PF09381 (ECOD; PDBsum)
- AlphaFold: PF09381

Outer membrane protein G (OmpG) is a porin, a channel proteins in the outer membrane of Gram-negative bacteria.

Escherichia coli OmpG forms a 14-stranded beta-barrel and in contrast to most porins, appears to function as a monomer. The central pore of OmpG is wider than other E. coli porins and it is speculated that it may form a non-specific channel for the transport of larger oligosaccharides.
