= Colanic acid =

Chemical compound

Identifiers
CAS Number	9012-87-7
3D model (JSmol)	repeating unit: Interactive image
PubChem CID	repeating unit: 134820122
- InChI: repeating unit: InChI=1S/C41H64O33/c1-8-25(16(47)19(50)35(62-8)69-26-9(2)63-38(24(55)31(26)64-10(3)44)70-28-14(45)11(5-42)65-34(58)22(28)53)68-39-23(54)29(15(46)12(6-43)66-39)71-37-21(52)18(49)30(32(73-37)33(56)57)72-36-20(51)17(48)27-13(67-36)7-61-41(4,74-27)40(59)60/h8-9,11-32,34-39,42-43,45-55,58H,5-7H2,1-4H3,(H,56,57)(H,59,60)/p-2/t8-,9+,11-,12-,13+,14-,15+,16-,17+,18-,19-,20+,21-,22-,23-,24+,25+,26-,27-,28+,29+,30+,31+,32+,34-,35+,36-,37-,38+,39+,41+/m0/s1 Key: DUGKXGQZYHUOFV-SOLNNGHASA-L
- SMILES: repeating unit: C[C@H]1[C@H]([C@H]([C@@H]([C@H](O1)O[C@H]2[C@H](O[C@@H]([C@@H]([C@H]2OC(=O)C)O)O[C@@H]3[C@H]([C@@H](O[C@@H]([C@H]3O)O)CO)O)C)O)O)O[C@@H]4[C@H]([C@@H]([C@@H]([C@@H](O4)CO)O)O[C@@H]5[C@H]([C@@H]([C@H]([C@@H](O5)C(=O)[O-])O[C@H]6[C@@H]([C@H]([C@@H]7[C@H](O6)CO[C@@](O7)(C)C(=O)[O-])O)O)O)O)O
- Except where otherwise noted, data are given for materials in their standard state (at 25 °C [77 °F], 100 kPa). Infobox references

Colanic acid is an exopolysaccharide synthesized by bacteria in the Enterobacteriaceae family. It is excreted by the cell to form a protective bacterial capsule, and it assists in the formation of biofilms.

== Structure ==
Colanic acid is composed of polyanionic heteropolysaccharides with hexasaccharide repeating units, consisting of glucose, fucose, galactose, and glucuronic acid. It also consists of O-acetyl groups and pyruvate side chains attached to these sugar molecules. It forms a protective capsule around cells, primarily Enterobacteriaceae. Colanic acid's high molecular weight and branching structure contribute to its high viscosity, while the carboxylic acid groups in its structure are the primary contributors to its acidity. It is considered mildly toxic when injected intraperitoneally in mice, and its effect on mammals can be compared to the effects of low doses of endotoxin, which can cause diarrhea and malaise.

E. coli colonies that produce colanic acid are said to be colicinogenic, and appear larger, smoother, and more opaque than those that do not. The colanic acid itself is observed as amorphous, white, and fibrous and is water-soluble as well as soluble in dilute salt solutions.

== Function ==
The main function of colanic acid is to form a protective slimy capsule around the cell surface under stressful conditions to increase its chances of survival. The stressful environment can come in the forms of desiccation, oxidative stress, and a low pH. Expression of colanic acid in E. coli has been shown to be required for the creation of normal E. coli biofilm architecture.

Colanic acid synthesis is up-regulated in biofilms, where acetylation plays a crucial role in modulating its structural conformation and physical and chemical properties. In E. coli, colanic acid plays an essential role in biofilm formation. However, it does not enhance bacterial adhesion, but instead blocks the establishment of specific binding between bacteria and the underlying substrate.

== Environmental factors ==
=== Temperature and pH ===
Colanic acid begins to be synthesized and accumulate at 19 °C. Nutrients modulate the production of colanic acid with maximal production occurring when glucose and proline are used as carbon and nitrogen sources. E. coli, a member of the Enterobacteriaceae family, is commonly used to study the conditions and effects of colanic acid production. A study showed that E. coli K92 is able to produce colanic acid at temperatures ranging from 19 °C to 42 °C, but it predominates at around 20 °C.

Colanic acid is typically produced at a low pH to protect bacteria from the acidic environment. A study was conducted to determine the minimal pH that E.coli could withstand. It was concluded that the production of colanic acid can range from a pH of 2 to a pH of 8; with the initial response to acidity occurring at a pH of 5.5.

Colanic acid production in E. coli is dependent on both lipopolysaccharide structure and glucose availability, because important nucleotide-sugar precursors are needed and provided by both.

== Activation and regulation ==
=== Activation ===
At least two positive protein regulators, RcsA and RcsB, are involved in the transcription of the operon for capsule (cps) gene expression in E. coli. The activation of colanic acid is due to an initial response to an environmental stimulus such as osmotic shock. This stimulus is relayed to the MdoH gene which is tied to the biosynthesis of MDOs. Unstable MDO levels due to changes within the environment, triggers the RcsC sensor to directly or indirectly relay the signal to the RcsB gene, which is a main activator of cps expression. The RcsA gene activates its own expression.

=== Regulation ===
The cps colanic acid operon can control the biosynthesis of colanic acid. It is composed of one large transcriptional unit that contains a ugd gene right outside the cps operon. It has been shown that the transcriptional antiterminator rfaH promotes said cps transcription. It does so by mediating the cps operon and promoting ugd expression.

A study was conducted to test whether RfaH was able to enhance cps colanic acid transcription for colanic acid production. E. coli K92 wild-type and rfaH mutant strains were grown and analyzed. It was observed that the deletion of rfaH had dramatically decreased colanic acid production in both.
