= Maltoporin =

LamB porin
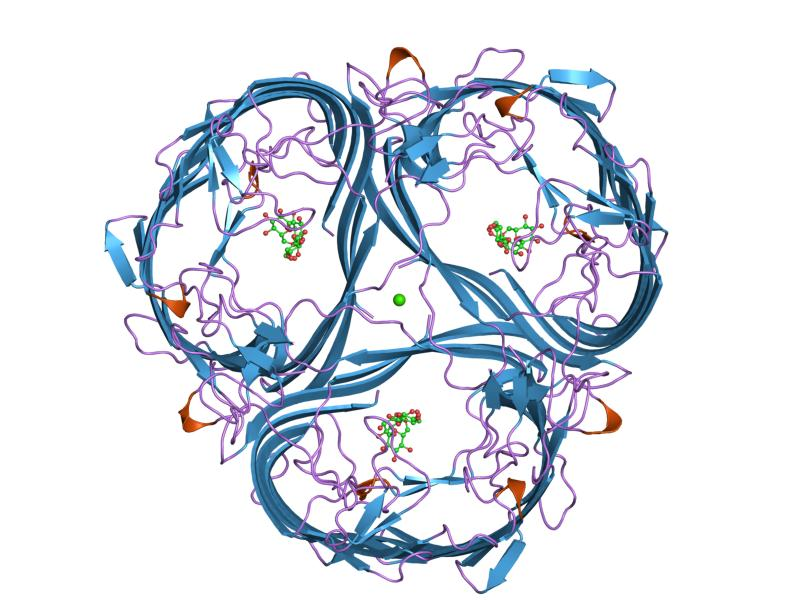
- Structure of maltoporin from Salmonella typhimurium.

Identifiers
- Symbol: LamB
- Pfam: PF02264
- InterPro: IPR003192
- SCOP2: 2mpr / SCOPe / SUPFAM
- TCDB: 1.B.3
- OPM superfamily: 32
- OPM protein: 2mpr
- CDD: cd01346
Available protein structures:
- PDB: 1a0sQ:97-505 1oh2R:97-505 1a0tP:97-505 1mprA:28-452 2mprB:28-452 1mpmA:28-446 1mpoC:28-446 1af6A:28-446 1malC:28-446 1mpqB:28-446 1mpnB:28-446 IPR003192 PF02264 (ECOD; PDBsum)
- AlphaFold: IPR003192; PF02264

Maltoporins (or LamB porins) are bacterial outer membrane proteins of the porin family. Maltoporin forms a trimeric structure which facilitates the diffusion of maltodextrins across the outer membrane of Gram-negative bacteria. The membrane channel is formed by an antiparallel beta-barrel.

Most pores used for diffusion contain only 16 antiparallel strands, but maltoporin has 18. The structure of maltoporin contains long loops and short turns. The long loops are in contact with the cell exterior and the turns are in contact with the periplasm. This channel is involved in sugar transport. The sugar initially binds to the first greasy residue with van der Waals forces. The sugar continues through the channel by guided diffusion of the sugar along the greasy residues which form a "slide".

Maltoporin's original name was LamB because it is a bacteriophage lambda receptor. This channel is specific for maltosaccharides, whose affinity for the channel increases as the length of the chain increases.
