= Lipid A acylase =

Antimicrobial peptide resistance and lipid A acylation protein PagP
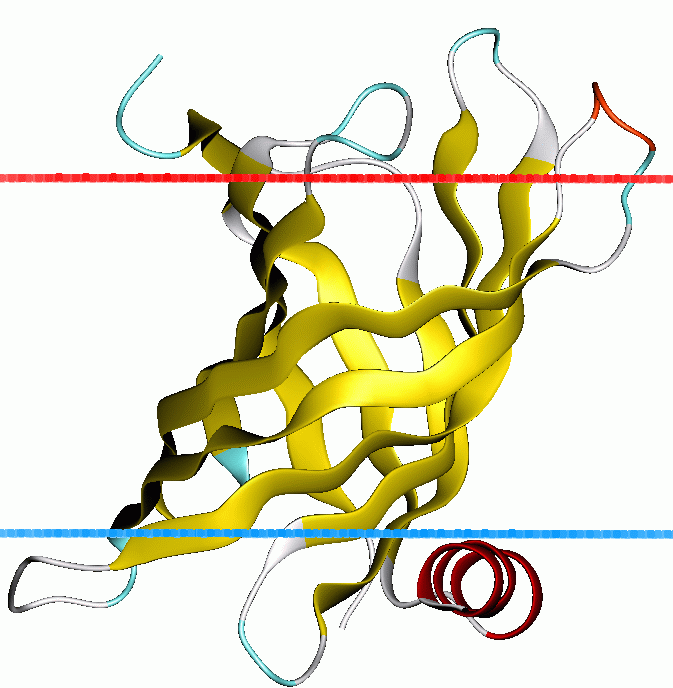

Identifiers
- Symbol: PagP
- Pfam: PF07017
- InterPro: IPR009746
- OPM superfamily: 237
- OPM protein: 3gp6
Available protein structures:
- PDB: IPR009746 PF07017 (ECOD; PDBsum)
- AlphaFold: IPR009746; PF07017

Antimicrobial peptide resistance and lipid A acylation protein PagP is a family of several bacterial antimicrobial peptide resistance and lipid A acylation (PagP) proteins. The bacterial outer membrane enzyme PagP transfers a palmitate chain from a phospholipid to lipid A. In a number of pathogenic Gram-negative bacteria, PagP confers resistance to certain cationic antimicrobial peptides produced during the host innate immune response.
