= Outer membrane protein OpcA =

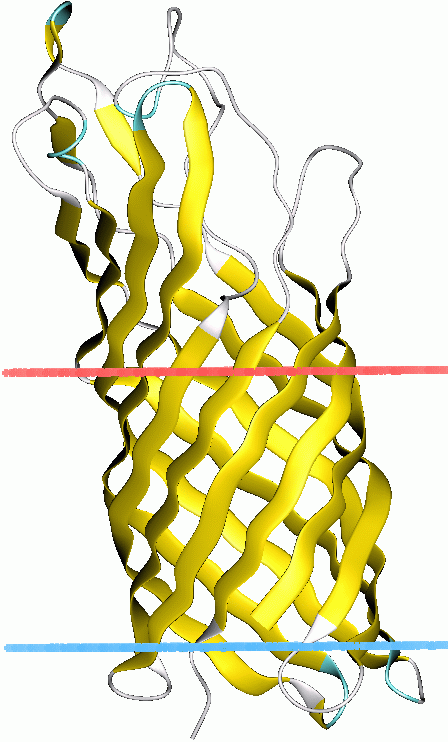

Identifiers
- Symbol: OpcA
- Pfam: PF07239
- InterPro: IPR009876
- SCOP2: 1k24 / SCOPe / SUPFAM
- OPM superfamily: 240
- OPM protein: 1k24
Available protein structures:
- PDB: IPR009876 PF07239 (ECOD; PDBsum)
- AlphaFold: IPR009876; PF07239

Outer membrane adhesin OpcA protein family consists of several Neisseria species specific outer membrane proteins. Neisseria meningitidis causes meningococcal meningitis and sepsis. Opc (formerly called 5C) is one of the major outer membrane proteins and has been shown to play an important role in meningococcal adhesion and invasion of epithelial and endothelial cells, mediating attachment to host cells by binding proteoglycan cell-surface receptors.

OpcA forms a 10-stranded beta-barrel with five highly mobile extracellular loops that protrude above the surface of the membrane. These extracellular loops combine to form a crevice in the external surface that is lined by positively charged residues, which is predicted to be a binding site for proteoglycan polysaccharides involved in pathogenesis. Conformational changes in the extracellular loops modulate the surface of OpcA, which could affect the proteoglycan binding site. These conformational changes could also lead to pore opening.
