= Membrane-oligosaccharide glycerophosphotransferase =

membrane-oligosaccharide glycerophosphotransferase

Identifiers
- EC no.: 2.7.8.21
- CAS no.: 80146-86-7

Databases
- IntEnz: IntEnz view
- BRENDA: BRENDA entry
- ExPASy: NiceZyme view
- KEGG: KEGG entry
- MetaCyc: metabolic pathway
- PRIAM: profile
- PDB structures: RCSB PDB PDBe PDBsum
- Gene Ontology: AmiGO / QuickGO
Search
- PMC: articles
- PubMed: articles
- NCBI: proteins

In enzymology, a membrane-oligosaccharide glycerophosphotransferase (EC 2.7.8.21) is an enzyme that catalyzes the chemical reaction in which a glycerophospho group is transferred from one membrane-derived oligosaccharide to another.

This enzyme belongs to the family of transferases, specifically those transferring non-standard substituted phosphate groups. The systematic name of this enzyme class is membrane-derived-oligosaccharide-6-(glycerophospho)-D-glucose:membra ne-derived-oligosaccharide-D-glucose glycerophosphotransferase. Other names in common use include periplasmic phosphoglycerotransferase, and phosphoglycerol cyclase.
