= OMPdb =

Content
- Description: β-barrel outer membrane proteins .
- Organisms: Gram-negative bacteria

Contact
- Research center: University of Athens
- Laboratory: Department of Cell Biology and Biophysics
- Authors: Konstantinos D Tsirigos, Pantelis G. Bagos and Stavros J. Hamodrakas
- Primary citation: Tsirigos & al. (2011)
- Release date: 2011

Access
- Website: http://www.ompdb.org

OMPdb is a dedicated database that contains beta barrel (β-barrel) outer membrane proteins from Gram-negative bacteria. Such proteins are responsible for a broad range of important functions, like passive nutrient uptake, active transport of large molecules, protein secretion, as well as adhesion to host cells, through which bacteria expose their virulence activity.

Their biological importance together with the inadequate annotation and classification found in public databases, urges the need for intensive studies and accurate data collection regarding β-barrel proteins.

Information included in OMPdb consists of sequence data, as well as annotation for structural characteristics (such as the transmembrane segments), literature references and links to other public databases, features that are unique worldwide. A list of protein entries with solved 3D-structure can be also found in each family entry page, when applicable.

Along with the database, a collection of profile Hidden Markov Models, originating mainly from the PFAM database, that were shown to be characteristic for β-barrel outer membrane proteins was also compiled. This set, when used in combination with the recently presented PRED-TMBB2 algorithm, will serve as a powerful tool in terms of discrimination and classification of novel β-barrel proteins and whole-proteome analyses.

The web interface of OMPdb offers the user the ability not only to view the available data, but also to submit advanced queries for text search within the database's protein entries or perform protein and domain searches. The most up-to-date version of the database can be downloaded in various formats (flat text, XML format or raw FASTA sequences).

In the download page, the user may download the complete dataset of β-barrel proteins, which is compiled following the regular updates of the PDBTM database, the OPM database and the list of membrane proteins of known 3D-structure from Stephen White 's laboratory at UC Irvine.

During 11–12 August 2014, OMPdb participated at the Protein Bioinformatics and Community Resources retreat in the Wellcome Trust Conference Centre, brought together the principal investigators of several specialized protein resources as well as those from protein databases from the large Bioinformatics centres. During this meeting some common key challenges involved in creating and maintaining such resources were discussed, along with various approaches to address them. An important outcome was the creation of a Specialist Protein Resource Network that aims to improve coordination of the activities of its member resources.
