= Resistance-nodulation-cell division superfamily =

RND permease superfamily
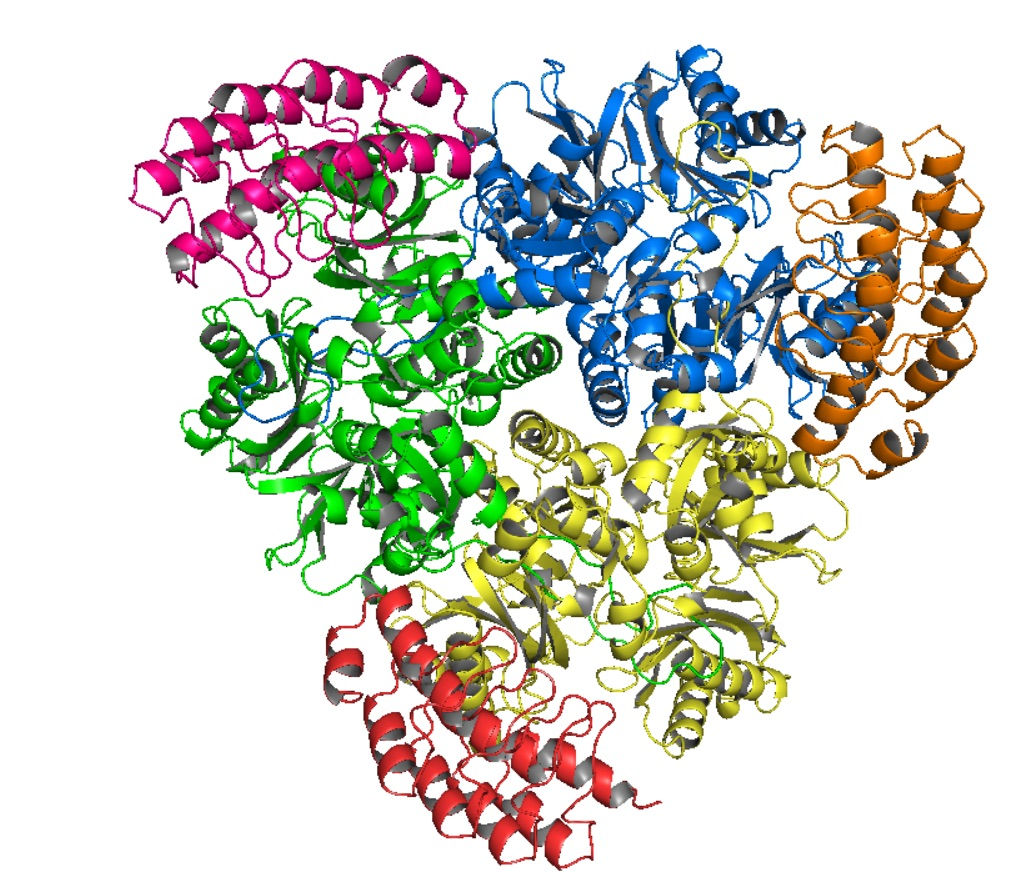
- Crystallized AcrB: An HAE-RND subclass protein involved in drug and amphiphilic efflux

Identifiers
- Symbol: RND_Permease
- Pfam clan: CL0322
- ECOD: 5067.1.1
- TCDB: 2.A.6
- OPM superfamily: 16
- OPM protein: 2gif

Resistance-nodulation-division (RND) family transporters are a category of bacterial efflux pumps, especially identified in Gram-negative bacteria and located in the cytoplasmic membrane, that actively transport substrates. The RND superfamily includes seven families: the heavy metal efflux (HME), the hydrophobe/amphiphile efflux-1 (gram-negative bacteria), the nodulation factor exporter family (NFE), the SecDF protein-secretion accessory protein family, the hydrophobe/amphiphile efflux-2 family, the eukaryotic sterol homeostasis family, and the hydrophobe/amphiphile efflux-3 family. These RND systems are involved in maintaining homeostasis of the cell, removal of toxic compounds, and export of virulence determinants. They have a broad substrate spectrum and can lead to the diminished activity of unrelated drug classes if over-expressed. The first reports of drug resistant bacterial infections were reported in the 1940s after the first mass production of antibiotics. Most of the RND superfamily transport systems are made of large polypeptide chains. RND proteins exist primarily in gram-negative bacteria but can also be found in gram-positive bacteria, archaea, and eukaryotes.

== Function ==
The RND protein dictates the substrate for the completed transport systems including: metal ions, xenobiotics or drugs. Transport of hydrophobic and amphiphilic compounds are carried out by the HAE-RND subfamily. While the efflux of heavy metals are preformed HME-RND.

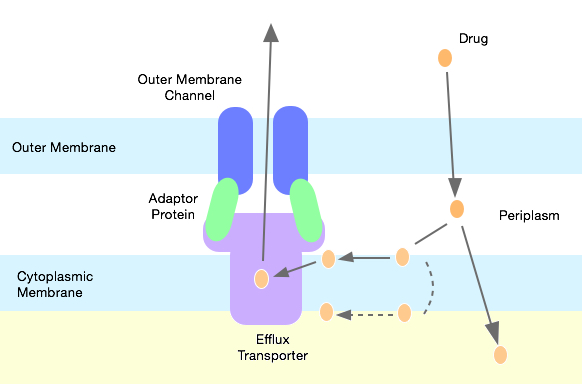
Triparitate Complex Model: RND inner-membrane protein, outer-membrane fusion protein, & periplasmic adaptor protein.

== Mechanism and structure ==
Crystallized CusA: HAE-RND subclass protein

RND proteins are large and can include more than 1000 amino acid residues. They are generally composed of two homologous subunits (suggesting they arose as a result of an intragenic tandem duplication event that occurred in the primordial system prior to divergence of the family members) each containing a periplasmic loop adjacent to 12 transmembrane helices. Of the twelve helices there is a single transmembrane spanner (TMS) at the N-terminus followed by a large extracytoplasmic domain, then six additional TMSs, a second large extracytoplasmic domain, and five final C-terminal TMSs. TM4 governs the specificity for a particular substrate in a given RND protein. Therefore, TM4 can be an indicator for RND specificity without explicit knowledge of the remainder of the protein.

RND pumps are the cytoplasmic residing portion of a complete tripartite complex (Fig. 1) which spreads across the outer-membrane and the inner membrane of gram-negative bacteria, also commonly referred to as the CBA efflux system. The RND protein associates with an outer membrane channel and a periplasmic adaptor protein, and the association of all three proteins allows the system to export substrates into the external medium, providing a huge advantage for the bacteria.

The CusA protein, a HME-RND member transporter, was able to be crystallized providing valuable structural information of HME-RND pumps. CusA exists as a homotrimer with each unit consisting of 12 transmembrane helices (TM1-TM12). The periplasmic domain consists of two helices, TM2 and TM8. In addition, the periplasmic domain is made up of six subdomains, PN1, PN2, PC1, PC2, DN, DC, which form a central pore and a dock domain. The central pore is formed by PN1, PN2, PC1, PC2, and together stabilize the trimeric organization of the homotrimer.

== Metal ion efflux (HME-RND) ==
The HME-RND family functions as the central protein pump in metal ion efflux powered by a proton-substrate antiport. The family includes pumps which export monovalent metals—the Cus system, and pumps which export divalent metals—the Czc system.

Heavy metal resistance by the RND family was first discovered in R. metallidurans through the CzcA and later the CnrA protein. The best characterized RND proteins include CzcCBA (Cd^{2+}, Zn^{2+}, and Co^{2+}), CnrCBA (Ni^{2+} and Co^{2+}), and NccCBA (Ni^{2+}, Co^{2+} and Cd^{2+}) in Cupriavidus, Czr (Cd^{2+} and Zn^{2+} resistance) in Pseudomonas aeruginosa, and Czn (Cd^{2+}, Zn^{2+}, and Ni^{2+} resistance) in Helicobacter pylori. It has been proposed that metal-ion efflux occurs from the cytoplasm and periplasm based on the location of multiple substrate binding sites on the RND protein.

=== CznCBA ===
The Czn system maintains homeostasis of Cadmium, Zinc, and Nickel resistance; it is involved in Urease modulation, and gastric colonization by H. pylori. The CznC and CznA proteins play the dominating role in nickel homeostasis.

=== CzcCBA ===
Czc confers resistance to Cobalt, Zinc, and Cadmium. The CzcCBA operon includes: CzcA (the RND family specific protein), the membrane fusion protein (MFP) CzcB, and the outer membrane factor protein (OMF) CzcC, all of which form the active tripartite complex, and the czcoperon. Expression of the operon is regulated through metal ions.

== Drug resistance (HAE-RND) ==
The RND family plays an important role in producing intrinsic and elevated multi-drug resistance in gram-negative bacteria. The export of amphiphilic and hydrophobic substrates is governed by the HAE-RND family. In E. coli five RND pumps have been specifically identified: AcrAB, AcrAD, AcrEF, MdtEF, and MdtAB. Although it is not clear how the tripartite complex works in bacteria two mechanisms have been proposed: Adaptor Bridging Model and Adaptor Wrapping Model.

HAE-RNDs involvement in the detoxification and exportation of organic substrates allowed for recent characterization of specific pumps due to their increasing medical relevance. Half of the antibiotic resistance demonstrated in in vivo hospital strains of Pseudomonas aeruginosa was attributed to RND efflux proteins. P. aeruginosa contain 13 RND transport systems, including one HME-RND and the remaining HAE-RNDs. Among the best identified are the Mex proteins: MexB, MexD, and MexF, which detoxify organic substances. It is proposed that the MexB systems demonstrates substrate specificity for beta-lactams; while the MexD-system expresses specificity for cepheme compounds.

=== E. coli – AcrB ===
In E. coli multi-drug resistance develops from a variety of mechanisms. Particularly concerning is the ability of efflux mechanisms to confer broad-spectrum resistance. RND efflux pumps provide extrusion for a range of compounds. Five protein transporters in E. coli cells that belong to the HAE-RND subfamily have been classified, including the multi-drug efflux protein AcrB, the outer membrane protein TolC and the periplasmic adaptor protein AcrA. The TolC and AcrA proteins are also utilized in the tripartite complex in other identified RND efflux proteins. The AcrAB-TolC efflux system is responsible for the efflux of antimicrobial drugs like penicillin G, cloxacillin, nafcillin, macrolides, novobiocin, linezolid, and fusidic acid antibiotics. Other substrates include dyes, detergents, some organic solvents, and steroid hormones. The ways in which the lipophilic domains of the substrate and the RND pumps is not completely defined.

The crystallized AcrB protein, provides insight into the mechanism of action of HAE-RND proteins, and other RND family proteins.

=== Multidrug transport (Mdt) efflux ===
Mdt(A) is an efflux pump that confers resistance to a variety of drugs. It is expressed in L. lactis, E. coli and various other bacteria. Unlike other RND proteins Mdt(A) contains a putative ATP-binding site and two C-motifs conserved in its fifth TMS. Mdt is effective at providing the bacteria with resistance to tetracycline, chloramphenicol, lincosamides and streptomycin. The source of energy for active efflux by Mdt(A) is currently unknown.
