= Outer membrane protein W family =

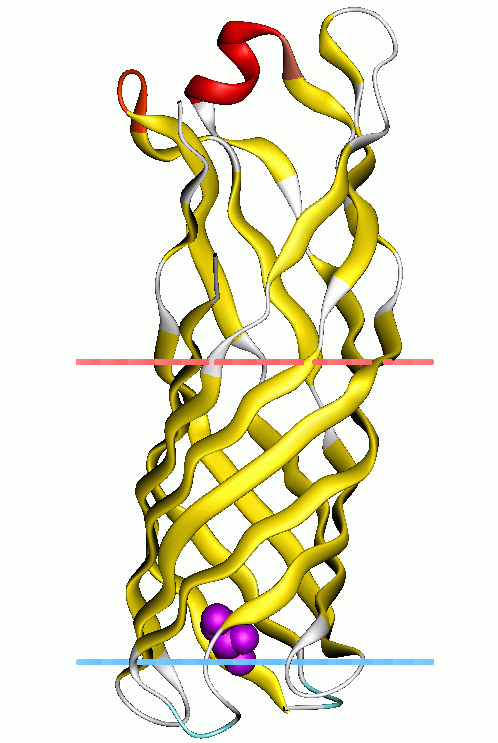
- Outer membrane protein W

Identifiers
- Symbol: OmpW
- Pfam: PF03922
- InterPro: IPR005618
- TCDB: 1.B.39
- OPM superfamily: 236
- OPM protein: 2x27
Available protein structures:
- PDB: IPR005618 PF03922 (ECOD; PDBsum)
- AlphaFold: IPR005618; PF03922

Outer membrane protein W (OmpW) family is a family of evolutionarily related proteins from the bacterial outer membrane.

This family includes outer membrane protein W (OmpW) proteins from a variety of bacterial species. This protein may form the receptor for S4 colicins in Escherichia coli.
