= Outer membrane efflux protein =

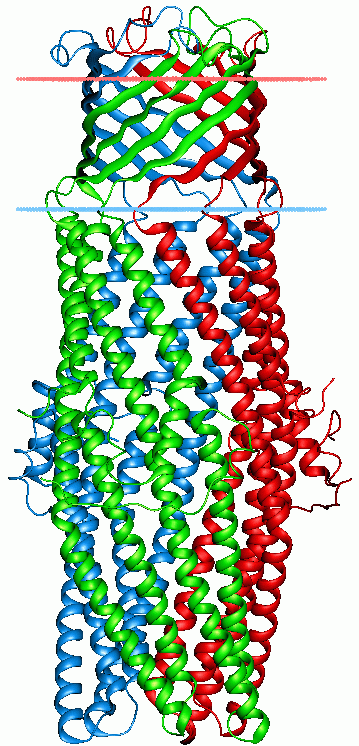

Identifiers
- Symbol: OEP
- Pfam: PF02321
- InterPro: IPR003423
- SCOP2: 1ek9 / SCOPe / SUPFAM
- TCDB: 1.B.17
- OPM superfamily: 34
- OPM protein: 1yc9
Available protein structures:
- PDB: IPR003423 PF02321 (ECOD; PDBsum)
- AlphaFold: IPR003423; PF02321

The outer membrane efflux protein is a protein family member that forms trimeric (three-piece) channels allowing the export of a variety of substrates in gram-negative bacteria. Each efflux protein is composed of two repeats. The trimeric channel is composed of a 12-stranded beta-barrel that spans the outer membrane, and a long tail helical barrel that spans the periplasm.

Examples include the Escherichia coli TolC outer membrane protein, which is required for proper expression of outer membrane protein genes; the Rhizobium nodulation protein; and the Pseudomonas FusA protein, which is involved in resistance to fusaric acid.
