= 2-sec-Butyl-4,5-dihydrothiazole =

Names
- Preferred IUPAC name 2-(Butan-2-yl)-4,5-dihydro-1,3-thiazole
- Other names SBT 2-(1-methylpropyl)-2-thiazoline 2-sec-butyl-2-thiazoline

Identifiers
CAS Number	56367-27-2
3D model (JSmol)	Interactive image
ChemSpider	142398
PubChem CID	162148
UNII	LE756QG3F5
CompTox Dashboard (EPA)	DTXSID00971802
- InChI: InChI=1S/C7H13NS/c1-3-6(2)7-8-4-5-9-7/h6H,3-5H2,1-2H3 Key: SAWWKXMIPYUIBW-UHFFFAOYSA-N; InChI=1S/C7H13NS/c1-3-6(2)7-8-4-5-9-7/h6H,3-5H2,1-2H3 Key: SAWWKXMIPYUIBW-UHFFFAOYSA-N
- SMILES: CCC(C)C1=NCCS1

Properties
Chemical formula	C_{7}H_{13}NS
Molar mass	143.25 g·mol^{−1}
Density	1.06 g/cm^{3}
Boiling point	193 °C (379 °F; 466 K)

Hazards
Flash point	70.5 °C (158.9 °F; 343.6 K)

Related compounds
Related compounds	Dihydrothiazole (thiazoline)
- Except where otherwise noted, data are given for materials in their standard state (at 25 °C [77 °F], 100 kPa). verify (what is ?) Infobox references

2-sec-Butyl-4,5-dihydrothiazole (also known as SBT) is a thiazoline compound with the molecular formula C_{7}H_{13}NS. A volatile pheromone found in rodents such as mice and rats, SBT is excreted in the urine and promotes aggression amongst males while inducing synchronized estrus in females.

== Binding to MUP ==
Mouse major urinary proteins (MUPs) are responsible for binding to hydrophobic ligands such as the pheromone SBT. SBT binds within MUP-I's barrel-shaped active site, forming a hydrogen bond with a water molecule within the active site, which in turn is stabilized by forming hydrogen bonds with residue Phe56 and another water molecule; this second water molecule also forms hydrogen bonds to residues in the active site, namely Leu58 and Thr39. SBT also forms van der Waals forces with several of MUP-I's residues, including Ala121, Leu123, Leu134, Leu72, Val100, and Phe108.

When bound, MUP safely carries SBT through the aqueous environment; once the protein-ligand complex is excreted in the urine, MUP helps prevent SBT decomposition and controls the slow release of SBT over a prolonged period of time, resulting in the physiological and behavioral responses of animals who come into contact with the pheromone.

== Synthesis ==
SBT can be produced from 3-(2-aminoethanethio)-4-methylhex-2-enenitrile; however, it is also possible to synthesize SBT from ethanolamine and 2-methylbutanoic acid, using Lawesson's reagent and microwave irradiation.
