= Efflux pump =

Protein complexes that move compounds, generally toxic, out of bacterial cells

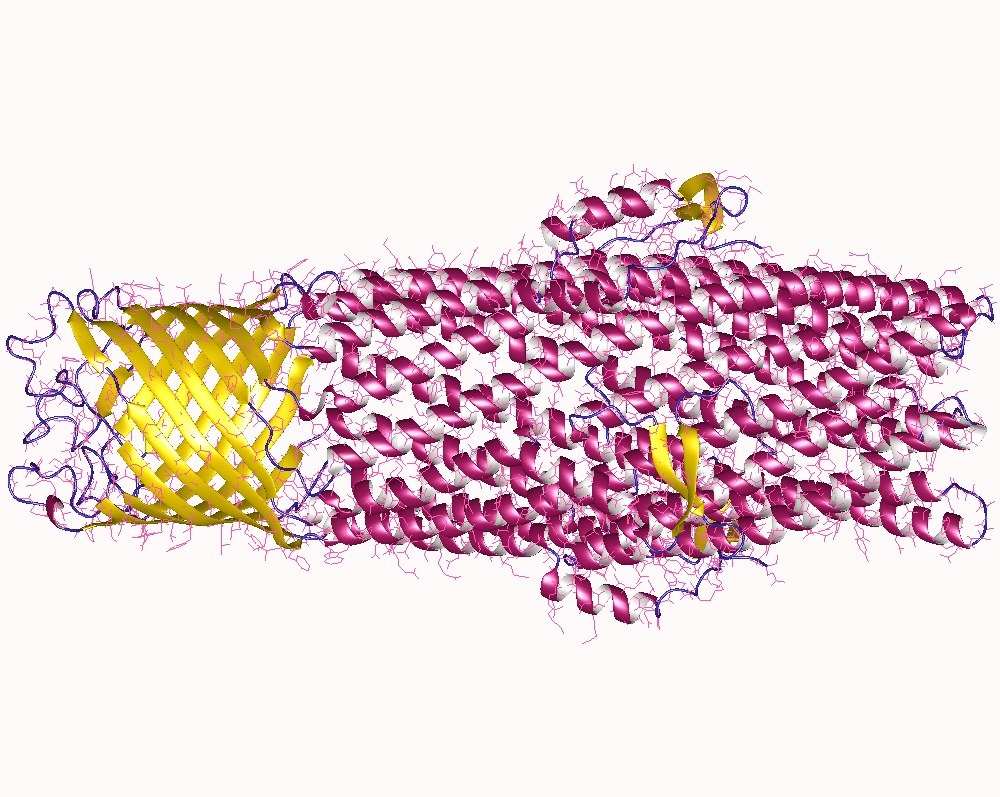
Protein TolC, the outer membrane component of a tripartite efflux pump in Escherichia coli.

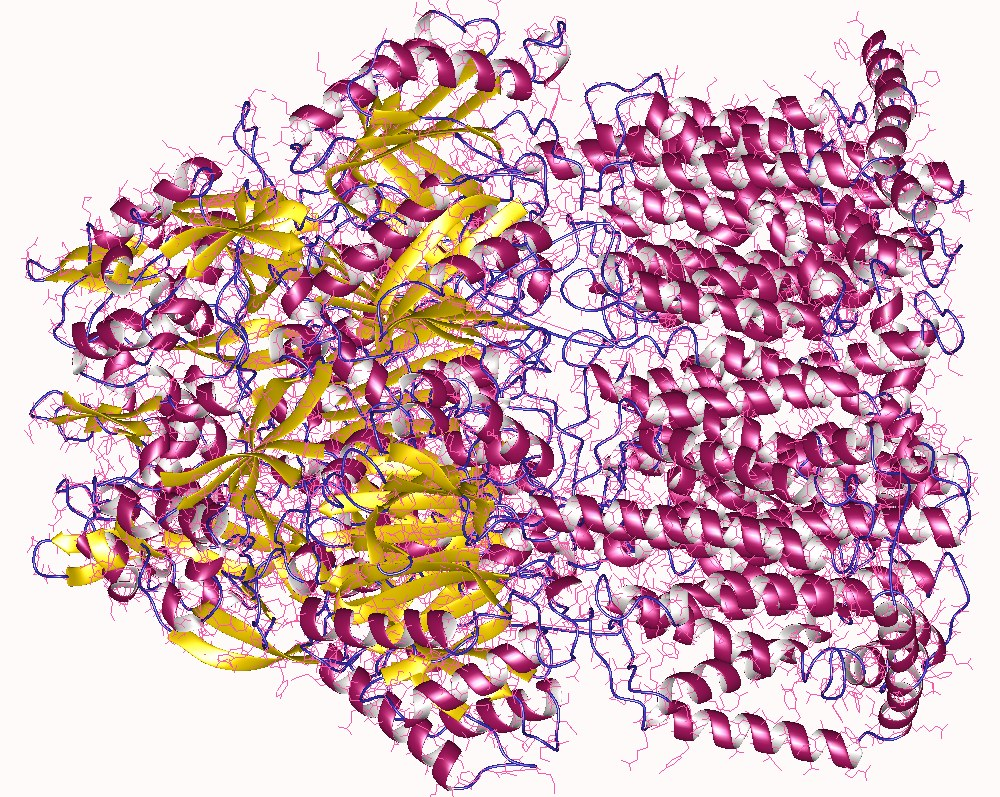
AcrB, the other component of pump, Escherichia coli.

An efflux pump is an active transporter in cells that moves out unwanted material. Efflux pumps are an important component in bacteria, particularly in their ability to remove antibiotics. The efflux process can also involve the movement of heavy metals, organic pollutants, plant-produced compounds, quorum sensing signals, bacterial metabolites, and neurotransmitters. All microorganisms, with a few exceptions, have highly conserved DNA sequences in their genome that encode efflux pumps. Efflux pumps actively move substances out of a microorganism, in a process known as active efflux, which is a vital part of xenobiotic metabolism. This active efflux mechanism is responsible for various types of resistance to bacterial pathogens within bacterial species, the most concerning being antibiotic resistance, as microorganisms can have adapted efflux pumps to divert toxins out of the cytoplasm and into extracellular media.

Efflux systems function via an energy-dependent mechanism (active transport) to pump out unwanted toxic substances through specific efflux pumps. Some efflux systems are drug-specific, whereas others can accommodate multiple drugs using small multidrug resistance (SMR) transporters.

Efflux pumps are proteinaceous transporters localized in the cytoplasmic membrane of all kinds of cells. They are active transporters, meaning that they require a source of chemical energy to perform their function. Some are primary active transporters utilizing adenosine triphosphate hydrolysis as a source of energy. In contrast, others are secondary active transporters (uniporters, symporters, or antiporters) in which transport is coupled to an electrochemical potential difference created by pumping hydrogen or sodium ions into the cell.

== Bacterial ==
Bacterial efflux pumps are classified into five major superfamilies, based on their amino acid sequence and the energy source used to export their substrates:

1. The major facilitator superfamily (MFS)
2. The ABC transporters
3. The small multidrug resistance family (SMR)
4. The resistance-nodulation-cell division superfamily (RND)
5. The multi antimicrobial extrusion protein family (MATE).

Of these, only the ABC superfamily is a primary transporter, the rest being secondary transporters utilizing proton or sodium gradient as a source of energy. Whereas MFS dominates in Gram positive bacteria, the RND family was once thought to be unique to Gram negative bacteria. They have since been found in all major kingdoms.

=== Structure ===
Efflux pumps generally consist of an outer membrane efflux protein, a middle periplasmic protein, an inner membrane protein, and a transmembrane duct. The transmembrane duct is located in the outer membrane of the cell. The duct is also bound to two other proteins: a periplasmic membrane protein and an integral membrane transporter. The periplasmic membrane protein and the inner membrane protein of the system are coupled to control the opening and closing of the duct (channel). When a toxin binds to this inner membrane protein, the inner membrane protein gives rise to a biochemical cascade that transmits signals to the periplasmic membrane protein and outer membrane protein to open the channel and move the toxin out of the cell. This mechanism uses an energy-dependent, protein-protein interaction that is generated by the transfer of the toxin for an H+ ion by the inner membrane transporter. The fully assembled in vitro and in vivo structures of AcrAB-TolC pump have been solved by cryoEM and cryoET.

=== Function ===
Although antibiotics are the most clinically important substrates of efflux systems, most efflux pumps probably have other natural physiological functions. Examples include:

- The E. coli AcrAB efflux system, which has a physiologic role of pumping out bile acids and fatty acids to lower their toxicity.
- The MFS family Ptr pump in Streptomyces pristinaespiralis appears to be an autoimmunity pump for this organism when it turns on the production of pristinamycins I and II.
- The AcrAB–TolC system in E. coli is suspected to have a role in the transport of the calcium-channel components in the E. coli membrane.
- The MtrCDE system plays a protective role by providing resistance to faecal lipids in rectal isolates of Neisseria gonorrhoeae.
- The AcrAB efflux system of Erwinia amylovora is important for this organism's virulence, plant (host) colonization, and resistance to plant toxins.
- The MexXY component of the MexXY-OprM multidrug efflux system of P. aeruginosa is inducible by antibiotics that target ribosomes via the PA5471 gene product.
- Efflux pumps have also been shown to play a role in biofilm formation. However, the substrates for such pumps, and whether changes in their efflux activity affect biofilm formation directly or indirectly, remain to be determined.

The ability of efflux systems to recognize a large number of compounds other than their natural substrates is probably because substrate recognition is based on physicochemical properties, such as hydrophobicity, aromaticity and ionizable character rather than on defined chemical properties, as in classical enzyme-substrate or ligand-receptor recognition. Because most antibiotics are amphiphilic molecules - possessing both hydrophilic and hydrophobic characters - they are easily recognized by many efflux pumps.

=== Impact on antimicrobial resistance ===
The impact of efflux mechanisms on antimicrobial resistance is large; this is usually attributed to the following:

- The genetic elements encoding efflux pumps may be encoded on chromosomes and/or plasmids, thus contributing to both intrinsic (natural) and acquired resistance, respectively. As an intrinsic mechanism of resistance, efflux pump genes can survive a hostile environment (for example, in the presence of antibiotics), which allows for the selection of mutants that over-express these genes. Being located on transportable genetic elements such as plasmids or transposons is also advantageous for the microorganisms as it allows for the easy spread of efflux genes between distant species.
- Antibiotics can act as inducers and regulators of the expression of some efflux pumps.
- Expression of several efflux pumps in a given bacterial species may lead to a broad spectrum of resistance when considering the shared substrates of some multi-drug efflux pumps, where one efflux pump may confer resistance to a wide range of antimicrobials.

== Eukaryotic ==
In eukaryotic cells, the existence of efflux pumps has been known since the discovery of P-glycoprotein in 1976 by Juliano and Ling. Efflux pumps are one of the major causes of anticancer drug resistance in eukaryotic cells. They include monocarboxylate transporters (MCTs), multiple drug resistance proteins (MDRs)- also referred to as P-glycoprotein, multidrug resistance-associated proteins (MRPs), peptide transporters (PEPTs), and Na+ phosphate transporters (NPTs). These transporters are distributed along particular portions of the renal proximal tubule, intestine, liver, blood–brain barrier, and other portions of the brain.

== Inhibitors ==
Several trials are currently being conducted to develop drugs that can be co-administered with antibiotics to act as inhibitors for the efflux-mediated extrusion of antibiotics. As yet, no efflux inhibitor has been approved for therapeutic use, but some are being used to determine the prevalence of efflux pumps in clinical isolates and in cell biology research. Verapamil, for example, is used to block P-glycoprotein-mediated efflux of DNA-binding fluorophores, thereby facilitating fluorescent cell sorting for DNA content. Various natural products have been shown to inhibit bacterial efflux pumps, including the carotenoids capsanthin and capsorubin, the flavonoids rotenone and chrysin and the alkaloid lysergol. Some nanoparticles, for example, zinc oxide, also inhibit bacterial efflux pumps.

== See also ==
- Antibiotic resistance
