= Bacterial outer membrane =

Plasma membrane found in gram-negative bacteria

Lipopolysaccharide-assembly, LptC-related

Identifiers
- Symbol: LptC
- Pfam: PF06835
- Pfam clan: CL0259
- InterPro: IPR010664
Available protein structures:
- PDB: IPR010664 PF06835 (ECOD; PDBsum)
- AlphaFold: IPR010664; PF06835

Structure of gram-negative cell envelope

Lipopolysaccharide-assembly

Identifiers
- Symbol: LptE
- Pfam: PF04390
- InterPro: IPR007485
- TCDB: 1.B.42
- OPM superfamily: 412
- OPM protein: 4q35
Available protein structures:
- PDB: IPR007485 PF04390 (ECOD; PDBsum)
- AlphaFold: IPR007485; PF04390

The bacterial outer membrane is found in gram-negative bacteria. Gram-negative bacteria form two lipid bilayers in their cell envelopes - an inner membrane (IM) that encapsulates the cytoplasm, and an outer membrane (OM) that encapsulates the periplasm.

The composition of the outer membrane is distinct from that of the inner cytoplasmic cell membrane - among other things, the outer leaflet of the outer membrane of many gram-negative bacteria includes a complex lipopolysaccharide whose lipid portion acts as an endotoxin - and in some bacteria such as E. coli it is linked to the cell's peptidoglycan by Braun's lipoprotein.

Porins can be found in this layer.

== Outer membrane proteins ==
Outer membrane proteins are membrane proteins with key roles associated with bacterial cell structure and morphology; cell membrane homeostasis; the uptake of nutrients; protection of the cell from toxins including antibiotics; and virulence factors including adhesins, exotoxins, and biofilm formation. There are a number of outer membrane proteins that are specifically virulence-related.

Outer membrane proteins consist of two major classes of protein - transmembrane proteins and lipoproteins. The transmembrane proteins form channels or pores in the membrane called porins, and actively pumping efflux channels.

The outer membranes of a bacterium can contain a huge number of proteins. In E. Coli for example there are around 500,000 in the membrane.

Bacterial outer membrane proteins typically have a unique beta barrel structure that spans the membrane. The beta barrels fold to expose a hydrophobic surface before their insertion into the outer membrane. Beta barrels vary in sequence and size that ranges from 8 to 36 beta strands. A subset of OMPs have a perisplasmic or an extracellular link to their beta barrel structure. An outer membrane protein is translocated across the inner membrane through Sec machinery, and finally inserted to the outer membrane by the barrel assembly machinery complex.

== Biogenesis ==
The biogenesis of the outer membrane requires that the individual components are transported from the site of synthesis to their final destination outside the inner membrane by crossing both hydrophilic and hydrophobic compartments. The machinery and the energy source that drive this process are not yet fully understood. The lipid A-core moiety and the O-antigen repeat units are synthesized at the cytoplasmic face of the inner membrane and are separately exported via two independent transport systems, namely, the O-antigen transporter Wzx (RfbX) and the ATP binding cassette (ABC) transporter MsbA that flips the lipid A-core moiety from the inner leaflet to the outer leaflet of the inner membrane. O-antigen repeat units are then polymerised in the periplasm by the Wzy polymerase and ligated to the lipid A-core moiety by the WaaL ligase.

The LPS transport machinery is composed of LptA, LptB, LptC, LptD, LptE. This supported by the fact that depletion of any one of these proteins blocks the LPS assembly pathway and results in very similar outer membrane biogenesis defects. Moreover, the location of at least one of these five proteins in every cellular compartment suggests a model for how the LPS assembly pathway is organised and ordered in space.

LptC is required for the translocation of lipopolysaccharide (LPS) from the inner membrane to the outer membrane. LptE forms a complex with LptD, which is involved in the assembly of LPS in the outer leaflet of the outer membrane and is essential for envelope biogenesis.

== Clinical significance ==
If lipid A, part of the lipopolysaccharide, enters the circulatory system it causes a toxic reaction by activating toll like receptor TLR 4. Lipid A is very pathogenic and not immunogenic. However, the polysaccharide component is very immunogenic, but not pathogenic, causing an aggressive response by the immune system. The sufferer will have a high temperature and respiration rate and a low blood pressure. This may lead to endotoxic shock, which may be fatal. The bacterial outer membrane is physiologically shed as the bounding membrane of outer membrane vesicles in cultures, as well as in animal tissues at the host–pathogen interface, implicated in translocation of gram-negative microbial biochemical signals to host or target cells.

== See also ==
- Host–pathogen interaction
- Maltoporin
- OMPdb
- Outer membrane efflux proteins
- Outer mitochondrial membrane
