= List of University of California, Berkeley alumni in science and technology =

This page lists notable alumni and students of the University of California, Berkeley. Alumni who also served as faculty are listed in bold font, with degree and year.

Notable faculty members are in the article List of UC Berkeley faculty.

== Astronomers and space explorers ==
- William F. Ballhaus, Jr., B.S. 1967, M.S. 1968, Ph.D. 1971 — former director of NASA's Ames Research Center, president and CEO of Aerospace Corporation (also listed in "Business and entrepreneurship" section)
- Michael C. Malin, B.A. (physics) 1967 — astronomer, principal investigator for the camera on Mars Global Surveyor, MacArthur Fellow, founder and CEO of Malin Space Science Systems, recipient of a NASA Exceptional Scientific Achievement Medal in 2002, recipient of the 2005 Carl Sagan Memorial Award
- Gerry Nelson, Ph.D. 1972 — inventor of the segmented mirror telescope, for which he was awarded the Kavli Prize, leading to the building of the Keck telescopes
- Roger J. Phillips, Ph.D. 1968 — team leader of Apollo 17 Lunar Sounder Experiment, former director of Lunar and Planetary Institute and recipient of the G K Gilbert Award and the Whipple Award.
- David J. Schlegel, Ph.D. 1995 — pioneered the largest dust maps of the Universe, used to map the expansion rate of the Universe to more than 10 billion light years, recipient of the Lawrence Award
- H. Paul Shuch, Ph.D. 1990 — SETI scientist
- Peter Smith, B.S. 1969 — principal investigator and project leader for the $420 million NASA robotic explorer Phoenix, which physically confirmed the presence of water on the planet Mars for the first time
- Martha Stahr Carpenter, Ph.D. 1945 — Astronomer, three term president of AAVSO, and first women faculty member in the Cornell University College of Arts and Sciences.
- Joel Stebbins, Ph.D. Physics 1903 — pioneered photoelectric photometry in astronomy, Royal Astronomical Society Gold Medal (1950), Henry Draper Medal (1915), Rumford Prize (1913), namesake of asteroid 2300 Stebbins and the Moon crater Stebbins
- Charles Bruce Stephenson, Ph.D. 1958 — astronomer
- Jean L. Turner, Ph.D. — professor of Astronomy and Physics at UCLA
- Theodore Van Zelst, B.S. 1944 — co-founder of Soiltest (testing company for soil, rock, concrete, and asphalt), recipient of the 1988 ASCE's "Chicago Engineer of the Year" award, developed the swing-wing design that allows supersonic aircraft to exceed the sound barrier, developed the first mobile baggage inspection unit, and developed lunar construction and soil testing for humankind's first steps on the moon

== Biologists ==
- David E. Garfin, Ph.D. — biophysicist who has made significant contributions to electrophoresis in both the engineering and biology communities and to the AES Electrophoresis Society
- Kathy Hudson, Ph.D. — Microbiologist specializing in science policy
- Edmund C. Jaeger — graduate student in 1918, became a renowned naturalist
- Lidia Mannuzzu, Ph.D. 1990 — biologist and physiologist, inventor of the biomolecular optical sensors with Ehud Y. Isacoff and Mario Moronne
- Constance Tom Noguchi — biophysicist, Chief of the Molecular Cell Biology Section at National Institute of Diabetes and Digestive and Kidney Diseases (NIDDK)
- Viviana Risca — geneticist and Rockefeller University assistant professor
- Donald W. Roberts, Ph.D. 1964 — Research Professor Emeritus at Utah State University, early contributor to the idea of biological pest control
- Howard Schachman — professor of biochem and molecular biology
- Gopalan Shyamala — conducted cancer and zoology research; mother of California U.S. Senator and American Vice President-elect, Kamala Harris

== Computer scientists and engineers ==
- Allan Alcorn, 1971 — employee #3 at video game company Atari, electronics designer behind Atari's seminal Pong video arcade unit, and erstwhile boss of Steve Jobs at Atari
- Eric Allman, B.S. EECS 1977, M.S. C.S. 1980 — creator of Sendmail (mail transfer agent which delivers 70% of the email in the world); inducted into the Internet Hall of Fame
- Ken Arnold, B.A. CS 1985 — creator of the Curses software library, co-creator of Rogue
- Donna Auguste, B.S. — a senior engineering manager who helped coordinate the development of the Newton PDA. As found on Computer History Museum Timeline of computers.
- Suchir Balaji, B.A. 2021 — a computer scientist turned whistleblower who worked for OpenAI from 2020 till 2024. He gathered and organized the Internet data that the company used to build its online chatbot, ChatGPT.
- Paul Benioff, B.S. — In a 1980 paper, Benioff described a microscopic quantum mechanical Hamiltonian model of a Turing machine. This groundbreaking work provided a theoretical foundation for the field, demonstrating that quantum computers were physically possible.
- Richard O. Buckius, Bachelor's '72 in Mechanical Engineering, Masters '73, Ph.D. '75 — Chief Operating Officer of the National Science Foundation
- David Chaum, Ph.D. CS 1982 — creator of the company DigiCash and the first digital currency, eCash
- Giovanni De Micheli, M.S. EECS 1980, Ph.D. EECS 1983 — pioneer of Network on a chip; Fellow of ACM and IEEE and a member of the Academia Europaea
- Wen-Tsuen Chen, Ph.D. 1976 — helped establish the Taiwan Academic Network (TANet), the first Internet in Taiwan; winner of the 2011 Taylor L. Booth Education Award (also listed in Chancellors and Presidents)
- Wesley A. Clark, B.S. Physics 1947 — designed the first modern personal computer (LINC), created the interface message processor for the original arpanet, lead engineer of the TX-0 Computer. The project lead for the construction of the TX-2 computer. The TX-Series of computers heavily influenced the PdP-1 computer.
- George Crow, B.S. EE 1966 — one of the original computer hardware designers of the Apple Macintosh computer. Cofounder of Next Computer.
- Donald D Eckdahl, B.S. — lead engineer of Maddida Computer. As found on Computer History Museum Timeline of computers.
- Alyosha Efros, Ph.D. 2003 — computer vision researcher and winner of the 2017 ACM Prize in Computing
- Katherine Faber, Ph.D. 1982 — professor of materials science at the California Institute of Technology, originator of the Faber-Evans model for ceramics
- Lee Felsenstein, B.S. — lead engineer of the Video Display Module Computer. As found on Computer History Museum Timeline of computers.
- Sally Floyd. B.S. 1971, Ph.D. 1989 — invented Random Early Detection, or RED, an algorithm widely used in the internet.
- Stanley Frankel, B.S. — Leader of the LGP-30 computer development . As found on Computer History Museum Timeline of computers.
- Andrea Frome, Ph.D. 2007 — known in the fields of computer vision, deep learning, and machine learning.
- John Gage, B.S. 1975 — fifth employee of Sun Microsystems, former chief researcher and vice-president of the Science Office for Sun Microsystems, current partner at venture capital firm Kleiner Perkins with Al Gore; credited with creating the phrase "the network is the computer"
- Gary Grossman, B.A. CS — software engineer, the "inventor of ActionScript" (the programming language utilized by Web content authors using the Adobe Flash Player platform)
- John Haanstra, B.S. EE — chairman of the Systems Programming, Research, Engineering, And Development (SPREAD) task force produced a pivotal 26-page report in December 1961 that became the foundation for the System/360 (as seen in computer history museum timeline of computers).Also, As an engineer and project leader at IBM's San Jose laboratory, Haanstra was instrumental in the development of the IBM 305 RAMAC (Random Access Method of Accounting and Control), which was released in 1956. This system was the first commercial computer to use a hard disk drive for random-access storage(as seen in computer history museum timeline of computers memory).
- Glenn Henry — attended UC Berkeley as an undergrad for 3 years. Lead engineer of the IBM PC-RT . As found on Computer History Museum Timeline of computers.
- Dick Hustvedt, B.S. — lead engineer of the "Starlet" software project that created the VAX/VMS operating system for the Digital Equipment Corporation Vax computer. As found on Computer History Museum Timeline of computers.
- Gilbert Hyatt, B.S. EE — filed the first patent for the microprocessor
- Jean Paul Jacob, M.S. and Ph.D. in Mathematics and Engineering (1966) — long research manager at the Almaden IBM Research Center, California; recipient of the University of California Research Leadership Award in 2003 for his 40 years of work and research development in its departments; electronic engineering degree (1960) from the Brazilian ITA
- Eugene Jarvis, B.S. EECS 1976 — creator of the classic Defender video arcade game; recipient of the Academy of Interactive Arts and Sciences Pioneer Award
- Lynne Greer Jolitz, B.A. 1989 — co-author, with husband William Jolitz, of 386BSD, which is the ancestor of FreeBSD, which in turn is an ancestor of Apple's Darwin operating system
- William Jolitz, B.A. 1997 — co-author, with wife Lynne Greer Jolitz, of 386BSD
- Bill Joy B.S. EECS and M.S. EECS 1979 — BSD UNIX, vi (text editor), Chroot, C shell
- Spencer Kimball, B.A. CS 1996 — creator of the GIMP software
- Phil Lapsley, B.S. EECS 1988, M.S. EECS 1991 — co-creator of the NNTP (Network News Transfer Protocol used by Usenet newsgroups)
- Bill Latin, B.S. — significant role in the development of the Motorola 6800 microprocessor in which he developed the MTIME simulator (used to design and verify the 6800’s MOS logic and single-supply NMOS circuits). As found on Computer History Museum Timeline of computers.
- Derrick Lehmer, B.S. — used the SWAC computer to prove fermat's last theorem for all prime exponents under 4002. Using the SWAC in 1952 mathematician Raphael M. Robinson, supervised by the Lehmers, discovered five new Mersenne primes. One of the first to use a computer to test whether the non-trivial roots of the zeta function lie on the critical line. using the SWAC to solve complex sieve problems related to prime numbers. As found on Computer History Museum Timeline of computers. IEEE computer science pioneer
- Anthony Levandowski, B.S. Industrial Engineering 2002, M.S. IEOR 2003 — product manager of the Google driverless car; inventor of robotic motorcycle "Ghostrider" featured at the Smithsonian Institution, software developer at Google serving on the inaugural StreetView team
- Ed Logg, B.A. C.S. — engineering creator of the classic video games Asteroids, Centipede, and Gauntlet at Atari; recipient of the Academy of Interactive Arts and Sciences Pioneer Award
- Gordon Eugene Martin, B.S. EE 1947 — pioneering piezoelectric materials researcher for underwater sound transducers
- John M. Martinis, B.S., Ph.D. — first to achieve quantum supremacy. Received nobel prize in physics 2025.
- Peter Mattis, B.S. CS 1997 — creator of GTK software
- Steven T. Mayer, B.S. — lead engineer of the Atari 400/800 computer.As found on Computer History Museum Timeline of computers.
- Jack McCauley, B.S. EE and C.S. 1986 — engineer, inventor and video game developer
- Peter Merholz, B.A. 1993 — coined the term "blog"
- Ralph Merkle, B.A. 1974, M.S. 1977 — pioneer in public-key cryptography computer algorithms, created Merkel trees. Greatly influenced diffie-hellman key exchange.
- Sam Mihara, B.A. 1956 — rocket scientist at Boeing and history educator focused on the incarceration of Japanese Americans
- Jay Miner, 1959 — inventor of the Amiga personal computer
- Larry Nagel, BS 1969, MS 1970, PhD 1975 — IEEE Donald O. Pederson Award in Solid-State Circuits for "the development and demonstration of SPICE as a tool to design and optimize electronic circuits."
- Mel Pirtle, B.S. — Lead engineer of Illiac IV computer at Nasa Ames research Center. As found on Computer History Museum Timeline of computers.
- Hans Reiser, B.A. 1992 — creator of the ReiserFS and Reiser4 computer filesystems
- Lucy Suchman, B.A. 1972, M.A. 1977, Ph.D. 1984 — Professor of Sociology, Lancaster University (UK); former research anthropologist at Xerox PARC and pioneer of human-computer interaction studies; author of Plans and Situated Actions (1987); awarded 2002 Benjamin Franklin Medal in Computer and Cognitive Science
- Andrew Tanenbaum, Ph.D. 1971 — computer scientist and creator of Minix, the precursor to Linux
- Ken Thompson, B.S., 1965; M.S., 1966 — Turing Award winner who designed and implemented the original Unix operating system, created programming language GO, created programming language B.
- Murray Turoff, B.A. Math and Physics 1958 — recipient of the Electronic Frontier Foundation's EFF Pioneer Award in 1994 for "significant and influential contributions to computer-based communications and to the empowerment of individuals in using computers"; distinguished professor emeritus at the New Jersey Institute of Technology
- Laurel van der Wal, B.S. 1949 — bioastronautics researcher
- David Wagner, M.S. 1999, Ph.D. 2000 — Professor of Computer Science; known for research in cryptography and security generally, including electronic voting
- William Yeager, B.A. 1964 — software developer who created the first multiple-protocol router software, which comprised the core of the first Cisco Systems IOS
- Ian A. Young, Ph.D. 1978 — senior fellow of Intel; co-inventor of Intel BiCMOS logic circuit family and clock design of Pentium series microprocessors from 50 MHz to 3 GHz

== Enrico Fermi Award ==
- John N. Bahcall, B.A. 1956 — 2003 Enrico Fermi Award for "innovative research in astrophysics leading to a revolution in understanding the properties of the elusive neutrino, the lightest known particle with mass."
- John S. Foster, Jr., Ph.D. 1952 — 1992 Enrico Fermi Award for "his outstanding contributions to national security, in technical leadership in the development of nuclear weapons, in leadership of Lawrence Livermore National Laboratory in its formative years, in technical leadership in the defense industry; and for excellent service and continued counsel to the government."
- M. Stanley Livingston, Ph.D. 1931 — 1986 Enrico Fermi Award for "his leadership contributions to the development of nuclear accelerators over a half century, from his involvement in the designing of the first cyclotrons to his role in the discovery of strong (alternating gradient) focusing, now used throughout the world for the design of nuclear accelerators and particle beams of the highest energies."
- Glenn T. Seaborg, Ph.D. 1937 — 1959 Enrico Fermi Award for "discoveries of plutonium and several additional elements and for leadership in the development of nuclear chemistry and atomic energy."
- Charles Shank, B.S. 1965, M.S. 1966, Ph.D. 1969– director (1989-2004) of the Lawrence Berkeley National Laboratory and professor (1989-2004) of chemistry, physics, and EE CS; 2015 Fermi Award for “the seminal development of ultrafast lasers and their application in many areas of scientific research, for visionary leadership of national scientific and engineering research communities, and for exemplary service supporting the National Laboratory complex.”,
- Stafford L. Warren, B.A. 1918 — pioneer in nuclear medicine; first dean of the School of Medicine at UCLA; 1971 Enrico Fermi Award for "the imaginative, prescient, and vigorous efforts which made possible the early development of atomic energy so as to assure the protection of man and the environment, and for the establishment of a biomedical research program which has resulted in many substantial applications of ionizing radiation to diagnosis and treatment of disease and to the general welfare."
- Robert R. Wilson, B.A. 1936, Ph.D. 1940 — 1973 National Medal of Science, 1984 Enrico Fermi Award for "his outstanding contributions to physics and particle accelerator designs and construction. He was the creator and principal designer of the Fermi National Laboratory and what is, at present, the highest energy accelerator in the world. His contributions have always been characterized by the greatest ingenuity and innovation and accomplished with grace and style."
- Herbert York, Ph.D. 1949 — 2000 Enrico Fermi Award for "his contributions to formulating and implementing arms control policy under four Presidents; for his founding direction of the Lawrence Livermore National Laboratory and his leadership in Research and Engineering at the Department of Defense; and for his publications analyzing and explaining these complex issues with clarity and simplicity."

== Feynman Prize ==
The Feynman Prize in Nanotechnology is awarded by the Foresight Institute for significant advancements in nanotechnology. The prize is named in honor of Nobel physicist Richard Feynman, whose 1959 talk '"There's Plenty of Room at the Bottom" is considered to have inspired the beginning of the field of nanotechnology.

- David Baker, Ph.D. 1989 — biochemist and computation biologist, professor at the University of Washington, known for protein structure prediction distributed computing project Rosetta@home and the video game Foldit, recipient of the 2004 Feynman Prize
- Marvin L. Cohen, B.A. Physics 1957 — professor of physics at UC Berkeley, 2003 Feynman Prize
- Steven Gwon Sheng Louie, Ph.D. 1976 — computational condensed-matter physicist, professor of physics at UC Berkeley, 2003 Feynman Prize
- Alex Zettl, B.A. 1978 — Professor of Condensed Matter Physics and Materials Science at UC Berkeley, Senior Scientist, Material Sciences Division, Lawrence Berkeley National Laboratory, recipient of the 2013 Feynman Prize

== Mathematicians and physicists ==
- David Bohm, Ph.D. 1943 — founded pilot-wave theory of quantum mechanics, also known as Bohmian mechanics
- James Joseph Brady, Ph.D. 1931 — physicist on the faculty of Oregon State University, Fellow of the American Institute of Physics
- Edward Condon, Ph.D. 1926 — pioneer in quantum physics, director of the National Bureau of Standards, president of the American Physical Society
- Marc Culler Ph.D. 1978 — mathematician working in geometric group theory and low-dimensional topology
- George Dantzig, Ph.D. 1946 — father of linear programming, created the simplex algorithm
- Andreas Floer — mathematician, inventor of Floer homology
- Albert Ghiorso, B.S. EE 1937 — co-discoverer of twelve chemical elements such as americium, berkelium, and californium
- Edward Ginzton, B.S. 1936, M.S. 1937 — recipient of the 1969 IEEE Medal of Honor, namesake of the Ginzton Laboratory at Stanford University
- Michio Kaku, Ph.D. 1972 — theoretical physicist, co-creator of string field theory, author of the New York Times bestsellers Hyperspace and Physics of the Impossible, radio host of Science Fantastic
- Joseph W. Kennedy, Ph.D. 1939 — codiscoverer of the element plutonium; later, professor and head of the department of chemistry at Washington University in St. Louis
- Arthur Scott King, Ph.D. 1903 — first ever Ph.D. in physics from this university
- Neville C. Luhmann Jr., B.S. 1966 — fellow of the American Physical Society
- Robyn Millan, B.A. 1995, M.A. 1999, Ph.D. 2002 — experimental physicist known for work on Earth's radiation belts
- Heidi Jo Marvin Newberg, Ph.D. 1992 — astrophysicist known for work in understanding the structure of our Milky Way galaxy
- John H. Schwarz, Ph.D. 1966 — theoretical physicist, one of the founders of superstring theory
- Daniel Whiteson, Ph.D. 2003 — particle physicist, professor of physics at University of California, Irvine

== Physicians and Allied Medical Specialists ==
- Tina L. Cheng — Chair of Pediatrics of Cincinnati Children's Hospital Medical Center.
- Zubin Damania (born 1973) — physician, comedian, internet personality, musician, and founder of Turntable Health
- C. Henry Kempe, B.S. 1942 — pediatrician who was the first to identify and recognize child abuse
- Madhu Pai, PhD — the Canada Research Chair of Epidemiology and Global Health at McGill University.
- Helen B. Taussig, B.A. 1921 – cardiologist, namesake of Blalock–Taussig shunt for blue baby syndrome; recipient of 1964 Medal of Freedom from President Lyndon Johnson; first female president of the American Heart Association; namesake of the "Helen B. Taussig Children's Pediatric Cardiac Center" at Johns Hopkins University; namesake of the Helen B. Taussig College at the Johns Hopkins University School of Medicine

== Other ==
- Hal Anger, B.S. 1943 – inventor of the scintillation camera (known as the Anger camera), pioneer in nuclear medicine
- Mary Kalin Arroyo, Ph.D. 1971 in Botany — professor, University of Chile
- Arlene Blum, Ph.D. 1971 in Chemistry — Executive Director of the Green Science Policy Institute, author, mountaineer who lead an all-woman ascent of Annapurna
- Michael J. Carey, B.S. 1983 — technical director at BEA Systems, member of the National Academy of Engineering
- Alan H. Coogan, M.A. 1957 — geologist specializing in applied sedimentary geology
- Richard M. Eakin, B.A. 1931, Ph.D. 1935 — Professor of Zoology, known for lecturing dressed as famous scientists
- Glen Edwards, B.S. 1941 — U.S. Air Force test pilot, namesake of Edwards Air Force Base
- Christine Essenberg, MA 1914, PhD 1917 - marine zoologist and women's education advocate. The sixth woman at the University of California, Berkeley to obtain a PhD in Zoology.
- Lillian Moller Gilbreth, B.A. 1900, M.A. 1902 — industrial/organizational psychologist along with her husband Frank Bunker Gilbreth who researched industrial worker efficiency; first woman member of the American Society of Mechanical Engineers; she and her husband were the basis of the books Cheaper by the Dozen and Belles on Their Toes, which were written by their children; commemorated on a United States Postal Service stamp in 1984; portrayed by Myrna Loy in the 1950 film Cheaper by the Dozen
- Maurice K. Goddard, M.S. 1938 — former secretary of the Pennsylvania Department of Conservation and Natural Resources, a driving force in the creation of 45 Pennsylvania state parks during his 24 years in office
- Charles Scott Haley, B.S. 1907 — was an expert in the field of placer gold deposits.
- Charles F. Harbison, B.A. 1933 — entomologist and the curator of entomology at the San Diego Natural History Museum
- Denham Harman, B.S. Chemistry, M.S. Chemistry, Ph.D. Chemistry 1943 — father of the free-radical theory of aging
- Dorothy M. Horstmann B.S. 1936 — virologist who made important discoveries about polio
- Susan Hough, B.A. 1982 — seismologist and author
- Harvey Itano, B.S. 1942 — professor of pathology at the University of California, San Diego, first Japanese American elected to the National Academy of Sciences, and pioneering researcher in sickle cell anemia
- Hope Jahren, Ph.D. 1996 in soil science — geobotanist and geochemist
- Richard F. Johnston — ornithologist, academic and author
- David Julius, Ph.D. 1984 — awarded Breakthrough Prize for discovering molecules, cells, and mechanisms underlying pain sensation
- Greg Kasavin — video game developer and former editor of GameSpot
- Ancel Keys, B.A. 1925, M.S. 1928, Ph.D. 1930 — originator of the low fat diet for cardiovascular disease, and the Keys Equation
- John Augustus Larson, Ph.D. 1920 — inventor of the modern lie detector
- Kate Marvel, B.A. 2003 — American climate scientist
- Jane McGonigal, M.A., 2003, Ph.D. 2006 in performance studies — game designer and games researcher; named one of the world's top innovators under the age of 35 by MIT's Technology Review in 2006
- Margaret Melhase, B.S. — co-discoverer of Caesium-137
- Anna María Nápoles, M.P.H., Ph.D. — behavioral epidemiologist and science administrator
- Roger Revelle, Ph.D. 1936 — one of the "grandfathers" (with Hans Suess) of the global warming hypothesis (but later wrote "the scientific base for a greenhouse warming is too uncertain to justify drastic action at this time"), "father" of the University of California, San Diego; founder of the Center for Population Studies at Harvard University where he mentored undergraduate Al Gore
- Loren L. Ryder, B.S. Physics 1924 — invented the use of magnetic tape in the sound of films, recipient of five Academy Awards for his technical expertise
- Zdenka Samish, M.A. 1933 — Czech-Israeli food technology researcher; one of first agricultural researchers in pre-state Israel
- Simon Schwartzman, Ph.D. 1973 — recipient of the Brazilian Order of Scientific Merit
- Carol Shaw, B.S. Engineering, M.A. C.S. — first woman video game designer
- Milicent Shinn, Ph.D. 1898 — child psychologist and author, first woman to earn a doctorate at Berkeley
- Tiffany Shlain, B.A. 1992 — founder of Webby Awards, filmmaker
- Oktay Sinanoğlu, B.S. 1956 — the "Turkish Einstein"; professor of chemistry and molecular biophysics and biochemistry at Yale University
- Tracy I. Storer, B.S. 1912, M.S. 1913, Ph.D. 1921 — zoologist specializing in California wildlife, founded Department of Zoology at U.C. Davis
- Nancy Stoyer, Ph.D. 1995 — nuclear chemist who helped discover elements 113-118
- Keith Tantlinger, B.S. 1941 — mechanical engineer, developer of the modern intermodal container (including the twistlock)
- Cher Wang — co-founder of VIA Technologies and HTC, and a pioneer of the smartphone.
- Gardner F. Williams, B.A. 1865, M.A. 1869 (first master's degree conferred by "College of California", aka UC/Berkeley) — first general manager of De Beers Consolidated Mines; mining engineer; wrote The Diamond Mines of South Africa; some account of their rise and development; awarded silver medal by the Royal Academy of Science in Sweden in 1905; awarded honorary doctorate of laws by the University of California in 1910
- Jenny Y. Yang, B.S. 2001 — chemist

== See also ==
- List of UC Berkeley faculty
- University of California, Berkeley School of Law
