= VSP =

VSP may refer to:

- V. S. Pritchett (1900–1997), author
- Valley State Prison in Chowchilla, California
- Vehicle Sound for Pedestrians, a noise warning system for electric vehicles developed by Nissan
- Vehicle-specific power, a formalism used in the evaluation of vehicle emissions
- Vermont State Police
- Vertical seismic profile (geophysics)
- Very Serious People, a phrase referring to commentators who retain a respectable reputation despite making regular or major errors, popularized by Paul Krugman
- Victoria Socialist Party, of Australia
- Videsha Seva Padakkama, a military decoration in Sri Lanka
- Virginia State Police
- Virtual Storage Platform, from Hitachi Data Systems
- Virtuoso Server Pages; see Virtuoso Universal Server
- Visakhapatnam Steel Plant
- Vision Service Plan, a vision insurance company
- VoIP, service provider
- Voith Schneider Propeller, a marine propulsion system
- Voitures sans permis, low-speed vehicles not requiring a driving licence to operate in France
- Voltage Sensitive Phosphatase, a family of voltage-regulated proteins
