= Arclight =

An arclight or arc lamp is a lamp that produces a bright light by generating an electric arc across two electrodes.

Arclight, Arc Light or arc light may also refer to:

== Arts and entertainment ==
=== Companies ===
- ArcLight Cinemas, a former American theatre chain based in Los Angeles (2002–2021)
- Arclight Films, an Australian film sales, distribution, and production company based in Sydney and Los Angeles

=== Characters ===
- Arclight (Marvel Comics), a mutant super-villain character from Marvel Comics
- Arclight (DC Comics), a super-villain character from DC Comics
- Arclight family, characters from the Yu-Gi-Oh! Zexal
- Jackson Dane (codename Arclight), a member of the Team 7 superheroes from Wildstorm Comics

=== Music ===
- Arc Light (album), a 2009 album by Lau
- Arclight (album), a 2016 album by Julian Lage
- Arclight, the third album by Swedish rock band Silverbullit
- "Arclight", a song by VNV Nation, from the album Empires
- "Arclight", a song by Deathstars, from the album Night Electric Night
- "Arclight", a song by Exhumed from the album Anatomy Is Destiny, 2003
- "Arclight", a song by The Fat Lady Sings

=== Other arts and entertainment ===
- Arc Light (novel), a 1994 techno-thriller novel by Eric Harry
- Arc Light (film), 1988 Chinese film
- Arclight (novel), a novel series by Josin L. McQuein

== Military ==
- ArcLight (missile), a development program of the Defense Advanced Research Projects Agency to develop a replacement for the Tomahawk missile
- Operation Arc Light, the 1965 deployment of B-52 Stratofortress bombers to Guam

== Other uses ==
- ArcLight (biology), a genetically-encoded voltage indicator
- Arclight Fabrication, an Aaron Kaufman owned business
