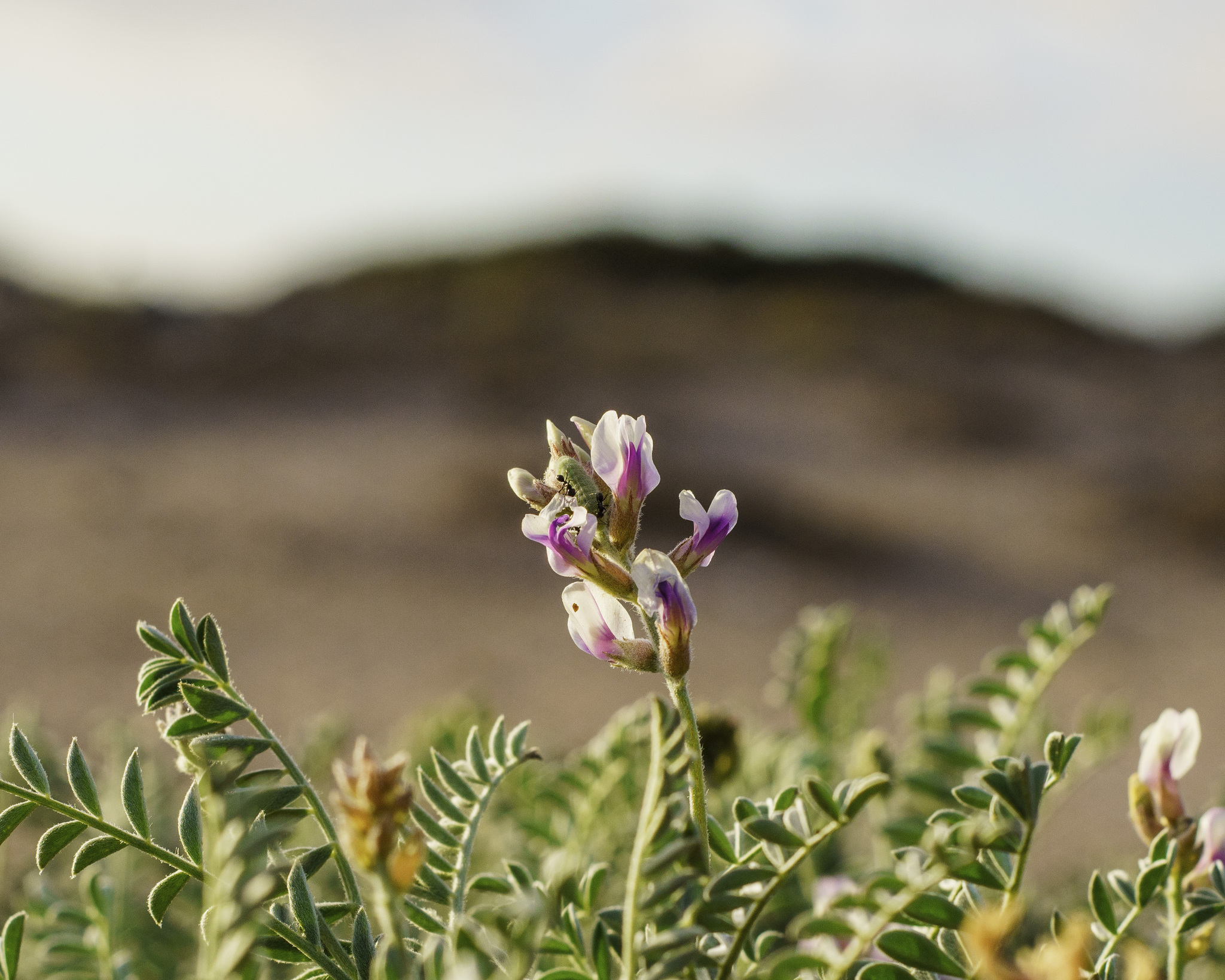
- A. harbisonii at the type locality of Punta Baja

Scientific classification
- Kingdom: Plantae
- Clade: Tracheophytes
- Clade: Angiosperms
- Clade: Eudicots
- Clade: Rosids
- Order: Fabales
- Family: Fabaceae
- Subfamily: Faboideae
- Genus: Astragalus
- Species: A. harbisonii

Binomial name
- Astragalus harbisonii Barneby

= Astragalus harbisonii =

Species of milkvetch

Astragalus harbisonii is a species of short-lived perennial plant in the family Fabaceae commonly known as the Punta Baja milkvetch. It is endemic to the Punta Baja peninsula in the Mexican state of Baja California and the immediate surrounding coastline. It is named after Charles F. Harbison, curator of entomology at the San Diego Natural History Museum from 1942 to 1969. This species is characterized by connate stipules and sessile bladdery pods, traits that it shares with Astragalus anemophilus, but the two species can be distinguished by their indumentum and distinct flowers.

== Taxonomy ==
Astragalus harbisonii was described by botanist and noted Fabaceae expert Rupert C. Barneby in 1953, based on a specimen collected by Charles F. Harbison. Harbison, the namesake of the species, was the curator of entomology at the San Diego Natural History Museum.

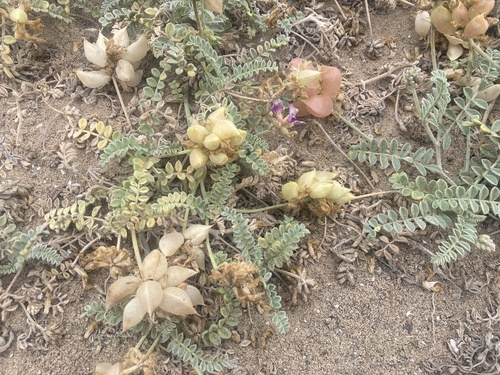
With fruit

In 1964, Barneby would later place this species in Astragalus section Anemophili, grouping it with Astragalus anemophilus and Astragalus miguelensis. This section is similar to Astragalus sect. Inflati in regards to the sessile, bladdery pods of the species, but sect. Anemophili is distinguished by the softly tomentose indumentum and connate stipules of its species.

=== Characteristics ===
Compared with Astragalus anemophilus, the two species share the connate stipules and sessile bladdery pods, but differ in a number of traits. Astragalus harbisonii has a villous-tomentose indumentum on the foliage, a strigose indumentum on the pods, smaller pods with less ovules, and differs in the shape, proportion, and lilac color of the flowers.

In regards to the shape, form, and proportion of the flowers, A. harbisonii more closely agrees with Astragalus miguelensis of the Channel Islands of California and Astragalus magdalenae, another maritime species native to the Baja California Peninsula. However, A. magdalenae is distinguished by its free stipules and satin-like indumentum on the foliage, and A. miguelensis has a consistently tomentose indumentum on the foliage and more ovules.

== Distribution & habitat ==
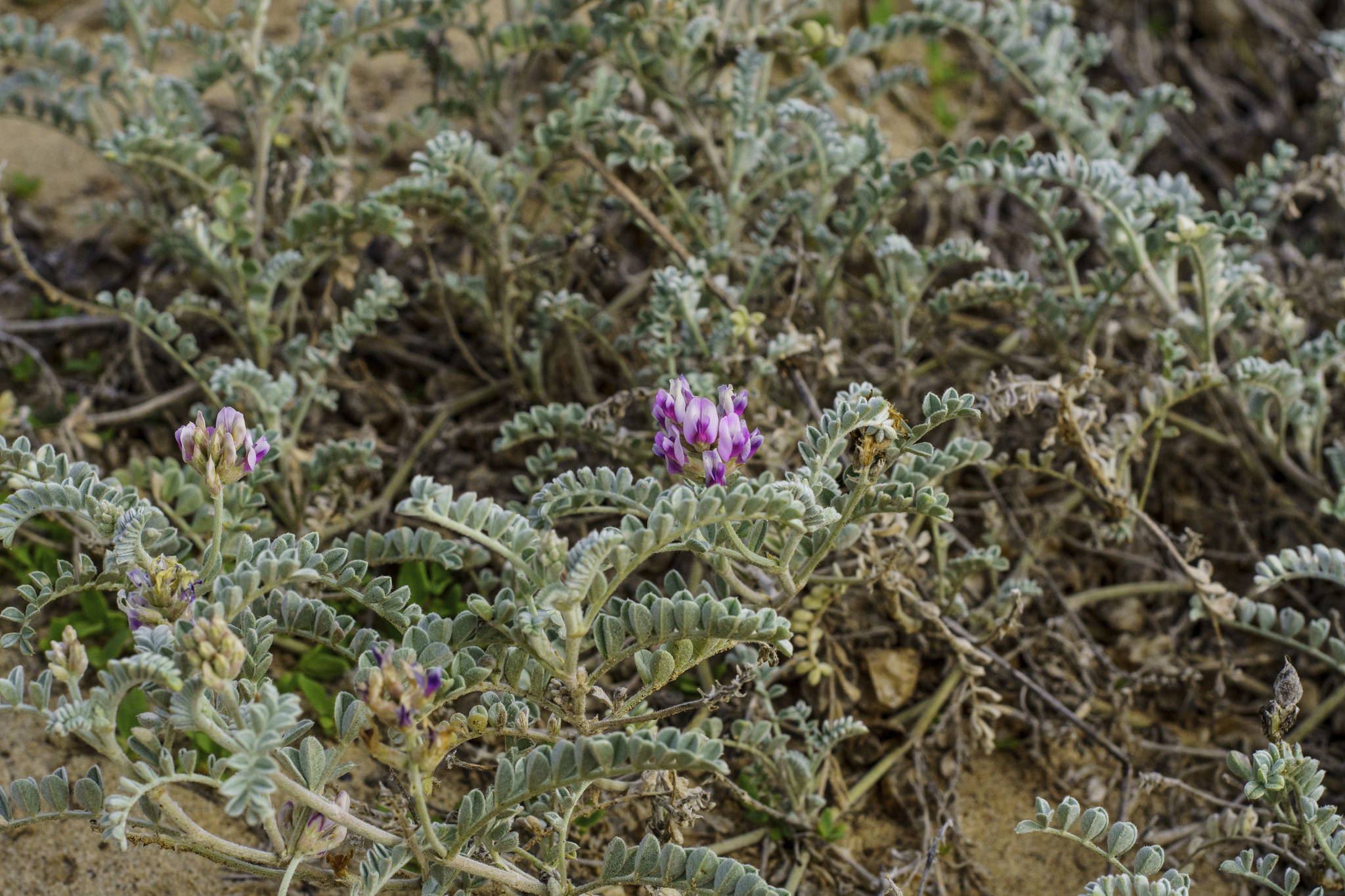
At the Arroyo El Rosario

Astragalus harbisonii is found in coastal fog desert on the northern central Baja California coast, occupying the coastal deserts immediately following the transition zone between California coastal sage scrub to the north and the drier Baja California desert. It was described from Punta Baja, a small cape south of El Rosario, but records exist as far north as at least the mouth of the Arroyo el Rosario.
