= Mannuzzu =

Mannuzzu is a surname. Notable people with the surname include:

- Lidia Mannuzzu (1958–2016), Italian biologist, physiologist and academic
- Salvatore Mannuzzu (1930–2019), Italian writer, politician, and magistrate
