= Genetically encoded voltage indicator =

Protein

Genetically encoded voltage indicator (or GEVI) is a protein that can sense membrane potential in a cell and relate the change in voltage to a form of output, often fluorescent level. It is a promising optogenetic recording tool that enables recording of electrophysiological signals from cultured cells and live animals. Examples of GEVI families include Quasar/Archon, Ace-mNeon, and ASAP.

== History ==
Even though the idea of optical measurement of neuronal activity was proposed in the late 1960s, the first successful GEVI that was convenient enough to put into actual use was not developed until technologies of genetic engineering had become mature in the late 1990s. The first GEVI, coined FlaSh, was constructed by fusing a modified green fluorescent protein with a voltage-sensitive K^{+} channel (Shaker). Unlike fluorescent proteins, the discovery of new GEVIs are seldom inspired by nature, for it is hard to find an organism which naturally has the ability to change its fluorescence based on voltage. Therefore, new GEVIs are mostly the products of genetic and protein engineering.

Two methods can be utilized to find novel GEVIs: rational design and directed evolution. The former method contributes to the most of new GEVI variants, but recent research using directed evolution have shown promising results in GEVI optimization.

== Structure ==
Conceptually, a GEVI should sense the voltage difference across the cell membrane and report it by a change in fluorescence. Many different structures can be used for the voltage sensing function, but one essential feature is that it must be embedded in the cell membrane. Usually, the voltage-sensing domain (VSD) of a GEVI spans across the membrane, and is connected to the fluorescent protein (FP). However, it is not necessary that sensing and reporting must happen in different structures - see, for example, the Archons.

By structure, GEVIs can be classified into four categories based on the current findings: (1) GEVIs contain a fluorescent protein FRET pair, e.g. VSFP1, (2) Single opsin GEVIs, e.g. Arch, (3) Opsin-FP FRET pair GEVIs, e.g. MacQ-mCitrine, (4) single FP with special types of voltage sensing domains, e.g. ASAP1. A majority of GEVIs are based on the Ciona intestinalis voltage sensitive phosphatase (Ci-VSP or Ci-VSD (domain)), which was discovered in 2005 from the genomic survey of the organism. Some GEVIs may have similar components, but in different positions. For example, ASAP1 and ArcLight both use a VSD and one FP, but the FP of ASAP1 is on the outside of the cell whereas that of ArcLight is on the inside, and the two FPs of VSFP-Butterfly are separated by the VSD, while the two FPs of Mermaid are relatively close to each other.

Table of GEVIs and their structure
GEVI^{[A]}	Year	Sensing	Reporting	Precursor
FlaSh	1997	Shaker (K^{+} channel)	GFP	-
VSFP1	2001	Rat Kv2.1 (K^{+} channel)	FRET pair: CFP and YFP	-
SPARC	2002	Rat Na^{+} channel	GFP	-
VSFP2's	2007	Ci-VSD	FRET pair: CFP (Cerulean) and YFP (Citrine)	VSFP1
Flare	2007	Kv1.4 (K^{+} channel)	YFP	FlaSh
VSFP3.1	2008	Ci-VSD	CFP	VSFP2's
Mermaid	2008	Ci-VSD	FRET pair: Marine GFP (mUKG) and OFP (mKOκ)	VSFP2's
hVOS	2008	Dipicrylamine	GFP	-
Red-shifted VSFP's	2009	Ci-VSD	RFP/YFP (Citrine, mOrange2, TagRFP, or mKate2)	VSFP3.1
PROPS	2011	Modified green-absorbing proteorhodopsin (GPR)	Same as left	-
Zahra, Zahra 2	2012	Nv-VSD, Dr-VSD	FRET pair: CFP (Cerulean) and YFP (Citrine)	VSFP2's
ArcLight	2012	Ci-VSD	Modified super ecliptic pHluorin	-
Arch	2012	Archaerhodopsin 3	Same as left	-
ElectricPk	2012	Ci-VSD	Circularly permuted EGFP	VSFP3.1
VSFP-Butterfly	2012	Ci-VSD	FRET pair: YFP (mCitrine) and RFP (mKate2)	VSFP2's
VSFP-CR	2013	Ci-VSD	FRET pair: GFP (Clover) and RFP(mRuby2)	VSFP2.3
Mermaid2	2013	Ci-VSD	FRET pair: CFP (seCFP2) and YFP	Mermaid
Mac GEVIs	2014	Mac rhodopsin (FRET acceptor)	FRET donor: mCitrine, or mOrange2	-
QuasAr1, QuasAr2	2014	Modified Archaerhodopsin 3	Same as left	Arch
Archer	2014	Modified Archaerhodopsin 3	Same as left	Arch
ASAP1	2014	Modified Gg-VSD	Circularly permuted GFP	-
Ace GEVIs	2015	Modified Ace rhodopsin	FRET donor: mNeonGreen	Mac GEVIs
ArcLightning	2015	Ci-VSD	Modified super ecliptic pHluorin	ArcLight
Pado	2016	Voltage-gated proton channel	Super ecliptic pHluorin	-
ASAP2f	2016	Modified Gg-VSD	Circularly permuted GFP	ASAP1
FlicR1	2016	Ci-VSD	Circularly permuted RFP (mApple)	VSFP3.1
Bongwoori	2017	Ci-VSD	Modified super ecliptic pHluorin	ArcLight
ASAP2s	2017	Modified Gg-VSD	Circularly permuted GFP	ASAP1
ASAP-Y	2017	Modified Gg-VSD	Circularly permuted GFP	ASAP1
(pa)QuasAr3(-s)	2019	Modified Archaerhodopsin 3	Same as left	QuasAr2
Voltron(-ST)	2019	Modified Ace rhodopsin (Ace2)	FRET donor: Janelia Fluor (chemical)	-
ASAP3	2019	Modified Gg-VSD	Circularly permuted GFP	ASAP2s
JEDI-2P	2022	Modified Gg-VSD	Circularly permuted GFP	ASAP2s
ASAP4	2023	Modified Gg-VSD	Circularly permuted GFP	ASAP2s
ASAP5	2024	Modified Gg-VSD	Circularly permuted GFP	ASAP3

1. ^{↑}Names in italic denote GEVIs not named.

== Characteristics ==
A GEVI can be evaluated by its many characteristics. These traits can be classified into two categories: performance and compatibility. The performance properties include brightness, photostability, sensitivity, kinetics (speed), linearity of response, etc., while the compatibility properties cover toxicity (phototoxicity), plasma membrane localization, adaptability of deep-tissue imaging, etc.

== Applications, advantages, and disadvantages ==
Different types of GEVIs are being developed in many biological or physiological research areas. Unlike earlier voltage detecting methods like electrode-based electrophysiological recordings or voltage sensitive dyes, GEVIs can be expressed stably, and can be targeted to particular cell types. GEVIs have subcellular spatial resolution and temporal resolution as low as 0.2 milliseconds, at least an order of magnitude faster than calcium imaging. This allows for spike detection fidelity comparable to electrode-based electrophysiology but without the invasiveness. Researchers have used them to probe neural communications of an intact brain (of Drosophila or mouse), electrical spiking of bacteria (E. coli), and human stem-cell derived cardiomyocyte.

Conversely, any form of voltage indication has inherent limitations. Imaging must be fast, or short voltage excursions will be missed. This means fewer photons per image exposure. Next, brightness per cell is inherently lower than calcium indicators, as about a 30-fold fewer voltage indicators can fit in the membrane compared to cytosolic calcium indicators.
