= Polycystin cation channel family =

Group of membrane proteins that passively export cations out of a cell

C-terminal Cytosolic Domain of Polycystin-2

Identifiers
- Symbol: PKD2
- Pfam: PF08016
- InterPro: IPR013122
- TCDB: 1.A.5
- OPM superfamily: 8
- OPM protein: 5mkf
Available protein structures:
- Pfam: structures / ECOD
- PDB: RCSB PDB; PDBe; PDBj
- PDBsum: structure summary

The Polycystin Cation Channel (PCC) Family (TC# 1.A.5) consists of several transporters ranging in size from 500 to over 4000 amino acyl residues (aas) in length and exhibiting between 5 and 18 transmembrane segments (TMSs). This family is a constituent of the Voltage-Gated Ion Channel (VIC) Superfamily. These transporters generally catalyze the export of cations. A representative list of proteins belonging to the PCC family can be found in the Transporter Classification Database.

== Crystal Structures ==
There are a number of crystal structures available for members of the PCC family. Some of these include:

PKD1: PDB: 1B4R

Polycystic kidney disease 2-like 1 protein: PDB: 3TE3, 4GIF

PKD2: PDB: 2KLD, 2KLE, 3HRN, 3HRO, 2KQ6, 2Y4Q

== Homologues ==
=== Human polycystin ===
Human polycystin 1 is a huge protein of 4303 amino acyl residues (aas). Its repeated leucine-rich (LRR) segment is found in many proteins. According to the UniProt description, polycystin 1 contains 16 polycystic kidney disease (PKD) domains, one LDL-receptor class A domain, one C-type lectin family domain, and 16-18 putative TMSs in positions between residues 2200 and 4100. However, atomic force microscopy imaging has revealed the domain structure of polycystin-1. It exhibits minimal sequence similarities, but similar domain organization and membrane topology with established cation channels such as the transient receptor potential (TRP) and voltage-gated ion channel (VIC) family proteins (TC# 1.A.4 and TC# 1.A.1, respectively). However, PSI-BLAST without iterations does not pick up these similarities. The PKD2L1-PKD1L3 complex perceives sour taste. Disruption of the PKD2-PKD1 complex, responsible for mechanosensation, leads to development of ADPKD (autosomal-dominant polycystic kidney disease). Besides modulating channel activity and related signaling events, the CRDs (C-terminal regulatory domains) of PKD2 and PKD2L1 play a central role in channel oligomerization. These proteins appear to form trimers.

=== Polycystin-L ===
Polycystin-L has been shown to be a cation (Na^{+}, K^{+} and Ca^{2+}) channel that is activated by Ca^{2+}, while polycystin-2 has been characterized as a Ca^{2+}-permeable cation-selective channel. Two members of the PCC family (polycystin 1 and 2; PKD1 and 2) are mutated in human autosomal dominant polycystic kidney disease, and polycystin-L, very similar and probably orthologous to PKD2, is deleted in mice with renal and retinal defects. PKD1 and 2 interact to form the non-selective cation channel in vitro, but PKD2 can form channels in the absence of any other associated protein. Polycystin-2 transports a variety of organic cations (dimethylamine, tetraethylammonium, tetrabutylammonium, tetrapropylammonium, tetrapentenyl ammonium). The channel diameter was estimated to be at least 1.1 Å. Both are reported to be integral membrane proteins with 7-11 TMSs (PKD1) and 6 TMSs (PKD2), respectively. They share a homologous region of about 400 residues (residues 206-623 in PKD2; residues 3656-4052 in PKD1) which includes five TMSs of both proteins. This may well be the channel domain. PKD2 and polycystin-L have been shown to exhibit voltage-, pH- and divalent cation-dependent channel activity. PKD1 may function primarily in regulation, both activating and stabilizing the polycystin-2 channel.

=== Transient receptor potential proteins ===
Transient receptor potential (TRP) polycystin 2 and 3 (TRPP2 and 3) are homologous members of the TRP superfamily of cation channels but have different physiological functions. TRPP2 is part of a flow sensor, and is defective in autosomal dominant polycystic kidney disease and implicated in left-right asymmetry development. TRPP3 is implicated in sour tasting in bipolar cells of taste buds of the tongue and in the regulation of pH-sensitive action potential in neurons surrounding the central canal of the spinal cord. TRPP3 is present in both excitable and non-excitable cells in various tissues, such as retina, brain, heart, testis, and kidney.

=== Mucolipin-1 ===
The TRP-ML1 protein (Mucolipin-1) has been shown to be a lysosomal monovalent cation channel that undergoes inactivating proteolytic cleavage. It shows greater sequence similarity to the transmembrane region of polycystin 2 than it does to members of the TRP-CC family (TC# 1.A.4). Therefore, it is included in the former family. Both the PCC and TRP-CC families are members of the VIC superfamily.

=== Alpha-actinin ===
Alpha-actinin is an actin-bundling protein known to regulate several types of ion channels. Planer lipid bilayer electrophysiology showed that TRPP3 exhibits cation channel activities that are substantially augmented by alpha-actinin. The TRPP3-alpha-actinin association was documented by co-immunoprecipitation using native cells and tissues, yeast two-hybrid, and in vitro binding assays. TRPP3 is abundant in mouse brain where it associates with alpha-actinin-2. Alpha-actinin attaches TRPP3 to the cytoskeleton and up-regulates its channel function.

== Physiological significance ==
Autosomal recessive polycystic kidney disease is caused by mutations in PKHD1, which encodes the membrane-associated receptor-like protein fibrocystin/polyductin (FPC) (Q8TCZ9, 4074aaa). FPC associates with the primary cilia of epithelial cells and co-localizes with the Pkd2 gene product polycystin-2 (PC2). Kim et al. (2008) have concluded that a functional and molecular interaction exists between FPC and PC2 in vivo.

== See also ==
- Voltage-gated ion channel
- Ion channel
- Transporter Classification Database
