= Potassium transporter family =

Family of transport proteins

Potassium transporter TrkH/TrkA

Identifiers
- Symbol: Trk
- Pfam: PF02386
- InterPro: IPR003445
- TCDB: 2.A.38
- OPM superfamily: 8
- OPM protein: 4j7c
Available protein structures:
- Pfam: structures / ECOD
- PDB: RCSB PDB; PDBe; PDBj
- PDBsum: structure summary

The K^{+} Transporter (Trk) Family is a member of the voltage-gated ion channel (VIC) superfamily. The proteins of the Trk family are derived from Gram-negative and Gram-positive bacteria, yeast and plants.

== Homology ==
The phylogenetic tree reveals that the proteins cluster according to phylogeny of the source organism with

1. the Gram-negative bacterial Trk proteins,
2. the Gram-negative and Gram-positive bacterial Ktr proteins,
3. the yeast proteins and
4. the plant proteins comprising four distinct clusters.

S. cerevisiae possesses at least two paralogues, high- and low-affinity K^{+} transporters. Folding pattern seen in Trk proteins resembles quadruplicated primitive K^{+} channels of the VIC superfamily (TC #1.A.1) instead of typical 12 TMS carriers. Homology has been established between Trk carriers and VIC family channels.

== Structure ==
The sizes of the Trk family members vary from 423 residues to 1235 residues. The bacterial proteins are of 423-558 residues, the Triticum aestivum protein is 533 residues, and the yeast proteins vary between 841 and 1241 residues. These proteins possess 8 putative transmembrane α-helical spanners (TMSs). An 8 TMS topology with N- and C-termini on the inside, has been established for AtHKT1 of A. thaliana. and Trk2 of S. cerevisiae. This folding pattern resembles quadruplicated primitive K^{+} channels of the VIC superfamily (TC #1.A.1) instead of typical 12 TMS carriers. As homology has been established between Trk carriers and VIC family channels.

== Function ==
Trk family members regulate various K^{+} transporters in all three domains of life. These regulatory subunits are generally called K^{+} transport/nucleotide binding subunits. TrkA domains can bind NAD^{+} and NADH, possibly allowing K^{+} transporters to be responsive to the redox state of the cell. The ratio of NADH/NAD^{+} may control gating. Multiple crystal structures of two KTN domains complexed with NAD^{+} or NADH reveal that these ligands control the oligomeric (tetrameric) state of KTN. The results suggest that KTN is inherently flexible, undergoing a large conformational change through a hinge motion. The KTN domains of Kef channels interact dynamically with the transporter. The KTN conformation then controls permease activity.

Both yeast transport systems are believed to function by K^{+}:H^{+} symport, but the wheat protein functions by K^{+}:Na^{+} symport. It is possible that some of these proteins can function by a channel-type mechanism. Positively charged residues in TMS8 of several ktr/Trk/HKT transporters probably face the channel and block a conformational change that is essential for channel activity while allowing secondary active transport.

The putative generalized transport reaction catalyzed by the Trk family members is:

K^{+} (out) + H^{+} (out) ⇌ K^{+} (in) + H^{+} (in).
