= TPTE =

Protein-coding gene in the species Homo sapiens

Identifiers
- Aliases: TPTE, CT44, PTEN2, transmembrane phosphatase with tensin homology
- External IDs: OMIM: 604336; GeneCards: TPTE
Enzyme activity
EC #	BRENDA	ExPASy	KEGG	MetaCyc
3.1.3.48	↗	↗	↗	↗

Gene location (Human)
Chr.	Chromosome 21 (human)
Band	21p11.2	Start	10,521,553 bp
Band	21p11.2	End	10,606,140 bp
RNA expression pattern
Bgee	Human / Mouse (ortholog); Top expressed in: right testis; left testis; testicle; gonad; placenta; renal cortex; right lobe of thyroid gland; left lobe of thyroid gland; body of stomach; anterior pituitary / n/a; More reference expression data
BioGPS	n/a
Gene ontology
Molecular function	protein tyrosine phosphatase activity; phosphoprotein phosphatase activity; hydrolase activity; protein tyrosine/serine/threonine phosphatase activity
Cellular component	integral component of membrane; membrane
Biological process	signal transduction; dephosphorylation; peptidyl-tyrosine dephosphorylation; protein dephosphorylation
Sources:Amigo / QuickGO
Orthologs
Databases	NCBI: entry; OMA: entry
Species	Human	Mouse
Entrez	7179	n/a
Ensembl	ENSG00000274391	n/a
UniProt	P56180	n/a
RefSeq (mRNA)	NM_199261; NM_001290224; NM_199259; NM_199260	n/a
RefSeq (protein)	NP_001277153; NP_954868; NP_954869; NP_954870	n/a
Location (UCSC)	Chr 21: 10.52 – 10.61 Mb	n/a
PubMed search		n/a
- Wikidata
View/Edit Human

Putative tyrosine-protein phosphatase TPTE is an enzyme that in humans is encoded by the TPTE gene.

== Function ==
TPTE is a member of a large class of membrane-associated phosphatases with substrate specificity for the 3-position phosphate of inositol phospholipids. TPTE is a primate-specific duplicate of the TPTE2 (TPIP) inositol phospholipid phosphatase; TPTE itself is predicted to lack phosphatase activity. TPTE and TPTE2 are the mammalian homologues to the subfamily of voltage sensitive phosphatases.
