= Ryanodine-Inositol 1,4,5-triphosphate receptor calcium channels =

Group of membrane channel proteins

Ryanodine receptor 2

Identifiers
- Symbol: RYR2
- Pfam: PF02026
- InterPro: IPR003032
- SMART: SM00054
- PROSITE: PS50188
- TCDB: 1.A.3
- OPM superfamily: 8
- OPM protein: 6dr2
Available protein structures:
- PDB: 4JKQ IPR003032 PF02026 (ECOD; PDBsum)
- AlphaFold: IPR003032; PF02026

The ryanodine-inositol 1,4,5-triphosphate receptor Ca^{2+} channel (RIR-CaC) family includes Ryanodine receptors and Inositol trisphosphate receptors. Members of this family are large proteins, some exceeding 5000 amino acyl residues in length. This family belongs to the Voltage-gated ion channel (VIC) superfamily. Ry receptors occur primarily in muscle cell sarcoplasmic reticular (SR) membranes, and IP_{3} receptors occur primarily in brain cell endoplasmic reticular (ER) membranes where they effect release of Ca^{2+} into the cytoplasm upon activation (opening) of the channel. They are redox sensors, possibly providing a partial explanation for how they control cytoplasmic Ca^{2+}. Ry receptors have been identified in heart mitochondria where they provide the main pathway for Ca^{2+} entry. Sun et al. (2011) have demonstrated oxygen-coupled redox regulation of the skeletal muscle ryanodine receptor-Ca^{2+} release channel (RyR1;TC# 1.A.3.1.2) by NADPH oxidase 4.

== Function ==
Ryanodine (Ry)-sensitive and inositol 1,4,5-triphosphate (IP_{3})-sensitive Ca^{2+}-release channels function in the release of Ca^{2+} from intracellular storage sites in animal cells and thereby regulate various Ca^{2+}-dependent physiological processes. The Ry receptors are activated as a result of the activity of dihydropyridine-sensitive Ca^{2+} channels. Ry receptors, IP_{3} receptors, and dihydropyridine-sensitive Ca^{2+} channels (TC#1.A.1.11.2) are members of the voltage-sensitive ion channel (VIC) superfamily (TC# 1.A.1). Dihydropyridine-sensitive channels are present in the T-tubular systems of muscle tissues. Ry receptor 2 dysfunction leads to arrhythmias, altered myocyte contraction during the process of EC (excitation-contraction) coupling, and sudden cardiac death. Neomycin is a RyR blocker which serves as a pore plug and a competitive antagonist at a cytoplasmic Ca^{2+} binding site that causes allosteric inhibition.

The generalized transport reaction catalyzed by members of the RIR-CaC family following channel activation is:

Ca^{2+} (out, or sequestered in the ER or SR) → Ca^{2+} (cell cytoplasm).

== Structure ==
Ry and IP_{3} receptors consist of (1) an N-terminal ligand binding domain, (2) a central modulatory domain and (3) a C-terminal channel-forming domain. The 3-D structure (2.2 Å) of the inositol 1,3,5-triphosphate receptor of an IP_{3} receptor has been solved (PDB: 1N4K). Structural and functional conservation of key domains in IP_{3} and ryanodine receptors has been reviewed by Seo et al. (2012). Members of the VIC (TC# 1.A.1), RIR-CaC (TC# 2.A.3) and TRP-CC (TC# 1.A.4) families have similar transmembrane domain structures, but very different cytosolic domain structures.

The channel domains of the Ry and IP_{3} receptors comprise a coherent family that shows apparent structural similarities as well as sequence similarity with proteins of the VIC family (TC #1.A.1). The Ry receptors and the IP_{3} receptors cluster separately on the RIR-CaC family tree. They both have homologues in Drosophila. Based on the phylogenetic tree for the family, the family probably evolved in the following sequence:

1. A gene duplication event occurred that gave rise to Ry and IP3 receptors in invertebrates.
2. Vertebrates evolved from invertebrates.
3. The three isoforms of each receptor arose as a result of two distinct gene duplication events.
4. These isoforms were transmitted to mammals before divergence of the mammalian species.

=== Ry receptors ===
Ry receptors are homotetrameric complexes with each subunit exhibiting a molecular size of over 500,000 daltons (about 5,000 amino acyl residues). They possess C-terminal domains with six putative transmembrane α-helical spanners (TMSs). Putative pore-forming sequences occur between the fifth and sixth TMSs as suggested for members of the VIC family. Recently an 8 TMS topology with four hairpin loops has been suggested. The large N-terminal hydrophilic domains and the small C-terminal hydrophilic domains are localized to the cytoplasm. Mammals possess at least three isoforms which probably arose by gene duplication and divergence before divergence of the mammalian species. Homologues are present in Drosophila melanogaster and Caenorabditis elegans.

Tetrameric cardiac and skeletal muscle sarcoplasmic reticular ryanodine receptors (RyR) are large (~2.3 MDa). The complexes include signaling proteins such as 4 FKBP12 molecules, protein kinases, phosphatases, etc. They modulate the activity of and the binding of immunophilin to the channel. FKBP12 is required for normal gating as well as coupled gating between neighboring channels. PKA phosphorylation of RyR dissociates FKBP12 yielding increased Ca^{2+} sensitivity for activation, part of the excitation-contraction (fight or flight) response.

=== IP_{3} receptors ===
IP_{3} receptors resemble Ry receptors in many respects.

1. They are homotetrameric complexes with each subunit exhibiting a molecular size of over 300,000 daltons (about 2,700 amino acyl residues).
2. They possess C-terminal channel domains that are homologous to those of the Ry receptors.
3. The channel domains possess six putative TMSs and a putative channel lining region between TMSs 5 and 6.
4. Both the large N-terminal domains and the smaller C-terminal tails face the cytoplasm.
5. They possess covalently linked carbohydrate on extracytoplasmic loops of the channel domains.
6. They have three currently recognized isoforms (types 1, 2, and 3) in mammals which are subject to differential regulation and have different tissue distributions. They co-localize with Orai channels (TC# 1.A.52) in pancreatic acinar cells.

IP_{3} receptors possess three domains:

1. N-terminal IP_{3}-binding domains,
2. central coupling or
3. regulatory domains and C-terminal channel domains.

Channels are activated by IP_{3} binding, and like the Ry receptors, the activities of the IP_{3} receptor channels are regulated by phosphorylation of the regulatory domains, catalyzed by various protein kinases. They predominate in the endoplasmic reticular membranes of various cell types in the brain but have also been found in the plasma membranes of some nerve cells derived from a variety of tissues.

Specific residues in the putative pore helix, selectivity filter and S6 transmembrane helix of the IP_{3} receptor, have been mutated in order to examine their effects on channel function. Mutation of 5 of 8 highly conserved residues in the pore helix/selectivity filter region inactivated the channel. Channel function was also inactivated by G2586P and F2592D mutations. These studies defined the pore-forming segment in IP_{3}.

== See also ==
- IP_{3} receptor
- Ryanodine receptor
- Voltage-gated ion channel
- Ion channel
- Receptor (biochemistry)
