= Transient receptor potential calcium channel family =

TRPA1 ion channel

Identifiers
- Symbol: TRP-CC
- Pfam: PF00520
- InterPro: IPR005821
- SMART: SM00248
- PROSITE: PS50088
- TCDB: 1.A.4
- OPM superfamily: 8
- OPM protein: 3j9p
Available protein structures:
- PDB: 3J9P IPR005821 PF00520 (ECOD; PDBsum)
- AlphaFold: IPR005821; PF00520

The transient receptor potential Ca^{2+} channel (TRP-CC) family (TC# 1.A.4) is a member of the voltage-gated ion channel (VIC) superfamily and consists of cation channels conserved from worms to humans. The TRP-CC family also consists of seven subfamilies (TRPC, TRPV, TRPM, TRPN, TRPA, TRPP, and TRPML) based on their amino acid sequence homology:

1. the canonical or classic TRPs,
2. the vanilloid receptor TRPs,
3. the melastatin or long TRPs,
4. ankyrin (whose only member is the transmembrane protein 1 [TRPA1])
5. TRPN after the nonmechanoreceptor potential C (nonpC), and the more distant cousins,
6. the polycystins
7. and mucolipins.

A representative list of members belonging to the TRP-CC family can be found in the Transporter Classification Database.

== Function ==
Members of the TRP-CC family are characterized as cellular sensors with polymodal activation and gating properties. Many TRP channels are activated by a variety of different stimuli and function as signal integrators. These mammalian proteins have been tabulated revealing their accepted designations, activators and inhibitors, putative interacting proteins and proposed functions. The founding members of the TRP superfamily are the TRPC (TRP canonical) channels, which can be activated following the stimulation of phospholipase C and/or depletion of internal calcium stores. However, the precise mechanisms leading to TRPC activation remain unclear. TRPC channels regulate nicotine-dependent behavior.

One member of the TRP-CC family, TRP-PLIK (1862 aas; AF346629), has been implicated in the regulation of cell division. It has an N-terminal TRP-CC-like sequence and a C-terminal protein kinase-like sequence. It was shown to autophosphorylate and exhibits an ATP phosphorylation-dependent, non-selective, Ca^{2+}-permeable, outward rectifying conductance. Another long homologue, Melastatin, is associated with melanocytic tumor progression whereas another homologue, MTR1, is associated with Beckwith-Wiedemann syndrome and a predisposition for neoplasia. Each of these proteins may be present in the cell as several splice variants.

The ability to detect variations in humidity is critical for many animals. Birds, reptiles and insects all show preferences for specific humidities that influence their mating, reproduction and geographic distribution. Because of their large surface area to volume ratio, insects are particularly sensitive to humidity, and its detection can influence their survival. Two types of hygroreceptors exist in insects: one responds to an increase (moist receptor) and the other to a reduction (dry receptor) in humidity. Although previous data indicated that mechanosensation might contribute to hygrosensation, the cellular basis of hygrosensation and the genes involved in detecting humidity remain unknown. To understand better the molecular bases of humidity sensing, investigated several genes encoding channels associated with mechanosensation, thermosensing or water transport.

=== Transport reaction ===
The generalized transport reaction catalyzed by TRP-CC family members is:

Ca^{2+} (out) ⇌ Ca^{2+} (in)

or

C^{+} and Ca^{2+} (out) ⇌ C^{+} and Ca^{2+} (in).

=== Anesthesia ===
Most local anaesthetics used clinically are relatively hydrophobic molecules that gain access to their blocking site on the sodium channel by diffusing into or through the cell membrane. These anaesthetics block sodium channels and the excitability of neurons. Binshtok et al. (2007) tested the possibility that the excitability of primary sensory nociceptor (pain-sensing) neurons could be blocked by introducing the charged, membrane-impermeant lidocaine derivative QX-314 through the pore of the noxious-heat-sensitive TRPV1 channel (TC #1.A.4.2.1). They found that charged sodium-channel blockers can be targeted into nociceptors by the application of TRPV1 agonists to produce a pain-specific local anaesthesia. QX-314 applied externally had no effect on the activity of sodium channels in small sensory neurons when applied alone, but when applied in the presence of the TRPV1 agonist capsaicin, QX-314 blocked sodium channels and inhibited excitability.

== Structure ==
Members of the VIC (TC# 1.A.1), RIR-CaC (TC# 2.A.3) and TRP-CC (TC# 1.A.4) families have similar transmembrane domain structures, but very different cytosolic domain structures.

The proteins of the TRP-CC family exhibit the same topological organization with a probable KscA-type 3-dimensional structure. They consist of about 700-800 (VR1, SIC or ECaC) or 1300 (TRP proteins) amino acyl residues (aas) with six transmembrane spanners (TMSs) as well as a short hydrophobic 'loop' region between TMSs 5 and 6. This loop region may dip into the membrane and contribute to the ion permeation pathway.

All members of the vanilloid family of TRP channels (TRPV) possess an N-terminal ankyrin repeat domain (ARD), which regulates calcium uptake and homeostasis. It is essential for channel assembly and regulation. The 1.7 Å crystal structure of the TRPV6-ARD revealed conserved structural elements unique to the ARDs of TRPV proteins. First, a large twist between the fourth and fifth repeats is induced by residues conserved in all TRPV ARDs. Second, the third finger loop is the most variable region in sequence, length and conformation. In TRPV6, a number of putative regulatory phosphorylation sites map to the base of this third finger. The TRPV6-ARD does not assemble as a tetramer and is monomeric in solution. Voltage sensing in thermo-TRP channels has been reviewed by Brauchi et al.

TRP channels have six TMS helices. These channels can be classified to six groups: TRPV (1-6), TRPM (1-8), TRPC (1-7), TRPA1, TRPP (1-3), and TRPML (1-3). TRP channels are involved in intracellular calcium mobilization and reabsorption. TRP channelopathies are involved in neurodegenerative disorders, diabetes mellitus, bowel diseases, epilepsy and cancer. Some TRP receptors act as molecular thermometers of the body. Some of them also play a role in pain and nociception.

=== Crystal structures ===
There are several crystal structures available for members of the TRP-CC family. Some of these include:

VR1: PDB: 2NYJ, 2NYN, 3J5P, 3J5Q, 3J5R

TRPV2 aka VRL-1: PDB: 2F37

Transient receptor potential cation channel subfamily A member 1: PDB: 3J9P

== See also ==
- Voltage-gated ion channel
- Ion channel
- Transporter Classification Database
