= Richard Buckius =

American professor of mechanical engineering (born 1950)

Richard Otto Buckius (born 1950) is an American engineer and professor of mechanical engineering at Purdue University. He served as the chief operating officer for the National Science Foundation (NSF) from 2014 to 2017.

== Early life and education ==
Buckius was born in 1950 in Sacramento, California, the third and youngest child of Orland Edwin Buckius and Holley Lynip Buckius. He moved with his family to Stockton, California. He has two older siblings.

The majority of Buckius' early education was in Stockton, California except for a short period when his father took a position in Banning, California. Buckius graduated from Stagg High School (Stockton, California) in 1968 and attended University of California, Berkeley. He received his bachelor's degree in mechanical engineering in 1972, his master's degree in 1973, then his PhD in 1975. All his degrees were from UC Berkeley.

== Career ==
Buckius is currently a professor of mechanical engineering at Purdue University. He was the chief operating officer for the National Science Foundation from October 2014 until his departure from the NSF in January 2017.

He was named vice president for research for Purdue University in May 2008 after having served as assistant director of the NSF's Directorate of Engineering since 2005 and previously as director of the agency's Division of Chemical and Transport Systems. He was head of the University of Illinois' Department of Mechanical and Industrial Engineering from 1998 to 2004, the Richard W. Kritzer Professor from 1992 to 1997 and associate vice chancellor for research from 1988 to 1991. He specializes in heat transfer. He co-wrote a textbook on thermodynamics in 1992.

== Selected publications ==
- Moser, K. W., E. C. Kutter, J. G. Gerogiadis, R. O. Buckius, H. D. Morris and J. R. Torczynski, "Velocity Measurements in Pipes with Sudden Contractions and Expansions Using Magnetic Resonance Imaging", Experiments in Fluids, 29, pp. 438–447, 2000.
- Moser, K. W. J. G. Georgiadis, and R. O. Buckius, "On the Accuracy of EPI-Based Phase Contrast Velocimetry", Magnetic Resonance Imaging, 18:9, pp. 1115–1123, 2000.
- Tang, K., and R. O. Buckius, "A Statistical Model of Wave Scattering from Random Rough Surfaces", International Journal of Heat and Mass Transfer, 44, pp. 4059–4073, 2001.
- Moser, K. W., J. G. Georgiadis, and R. O. Buckius, "On the Use of Optical Flow Methods with Spin-Tagging Magnetic Resonance Imaging", Annals of Biomedical Engineering, 29, 1-9, 2001.
- Holdych, D. J., J. G. Georgiadis and R. O. Buckius, “Migration of a van der Waals Bubble: Lattice Boltzmann Formulation,” Physics of Fluids, 13:4, pp. 817–825, 2001.
- Kawka, P. A. and R. O. Buckius, "Optical Properties of Polyimide Films in the Infrared", International Journal of Thermophysics, 22:2, pp. 517–534, 2002.
- Holdych, D. J., D. R. Noble, J. G. Georgiadis, and R. O. Buckius, "Truncation Error Analysis of Lattice Boltzmann Methods", J. of Computational Physics, 193, 595-619, 2004.
- Holdych, D. J., J. G. Georgiadis, and R. O. Buckius, "Hydrodynamic Instabilities of Near-Critical CO2 Flow in Micro-channels: Lattice Boltzmann Simulation", Physics of Fluids, 16:5, 1791–1802, 2004.
- He, J, W.-L. Cheng, and R. O. Buckius, "Wide Band Cumulative Absorption Coefficient Distribution Model for Overlapping Absorption in H2O and CO2 Mixtures", International Journal of Heat and Mass Transfer, 51, 1115–1129, 2008.
- He, J, and R. O. Buckius, "Improved Band Parameters for a Simplified Wide Band Cumulative Absorption Coefficient Distribution Model for H2O and CO2", International Journal of Heat and Mass Transfer, 51, 1467–1474, 2008.
