= Constance Tom Noguchi =

Molecular biologist

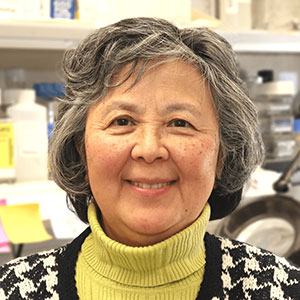
- Noguchi at the National Institute of Diabetes and Digestive and Kidney Diseases circa 2019
- Born: Constance Tom; December 8, 1948 (age 77); Guangzhou, China
- Education: University of California, Berkeley, George Washington University
- Partner: Philip David Noguchi
- Scientific career
- Institutions: National Institute of Diabetes and Digestive and Kidney Diseases (NIDDK)

Constance Tom Noguchi (born December 8, 1948) is a research physicist, Chief of the Molecular Cell Biology Section, and Dean of the Foundation for Advanced Education in the Sciences (FAES) Graduate School at the National Institute of Diabetes and Digestive and Kidney Diseases (NIDDK) of the National Institutes of Health (NIH). Noguchi studies the underlying genetics, metabolism, and treatment of sickle cell disease and of erythropoietin and its effects on metabolism.

Noguchi has published over 250 scientific articles with over 9491 citations. Noguchi is one of 21 Asian Americans profiled in Asian American Biographies (1994) for their contributions to the arts, politics, and science. She is the subject of Scientist and puzzle solver, Constance Tom Noguchi (1985).

== Early life and education ==
Constance Tom was born on December 8, 1948, in Guangzhou (Canton, China) to James Tom and Irene Cheung. Her father was a Chinese-American, and the family soon returned to the United States. Constance Tom grew up in San Francisco, California and married Philip David Noguchi in 1969.

Noguchi studied in mathematics and physics at the University of California, Berkeley, receiving her B.Sc. in 1970. She then attended George Washington University where she received her PhD in theoretical nuclear physics in 1975.

== Career ==
Noguchi joined the National Institutes of Health (NIH) in 1975, as a fellow with Alan N. Schechter at the National Institute of Diabetes and Digestive and Kidney Diseases (NIDDK). Noguchi became a research physicist at NIDDK in 1985. She became Chief of the Molecular Cell Biology Section of NIDDK in 1994, and Dean of the NIH's Foundation for Advanced Education in the Sciences (FAES) in 1999.

Noguchi studies the underlying genetics, metabolism, and treatment of sickle cell disease, in particular sickle hemoglobin polymerization. Noguchi has developed methods to measure the severity of sickle cell disease, a disease that affects newborns. By measuring oxygen saturation, total hemoglobin concentration, and hemoglobin composition, she calculates the polymer content of sickle cells. Polymer content can be used to choose treatments and assess their effectiveness. Noguchi has studied hydroxyurea and hemoglobin, showing that hydroxyurea can increase a form of fetal hemoglobin in sickle cell disease. Noguchi has also shown that polymer formation correlates with mean corpuscular hemoglobin concentration (MCHC), and will vary from patient to patient.

In 1991, Noguchi isolated and cloned the human erythropoietin receptor gene. Erythropoietin is an essential hormone for red blood cell production that is produced by the kidneys and binds to the erythropoietin receptor (EpoR). When a person's erythrocyte count is higher than the normal range for their sex, the disease state erythrocytosis can occur. Erythrocytosis has been linked to a variety of EpoR gene mutations.

Erythropoietin regulation is involved in metabolism in a number of ways, including oxygen delivery, maintenance of white adipose tissue, and the maintenance of metabolic homeostasis.

== Awards and honors ==
- 1995, APIAAC outstanding achievement award, National Institutes of Health
- 2001, Mentoring Award, Association for Women in Science, Bethesda
