= Voltage-gated ion channel =

Type of ion channel transmembrane protein

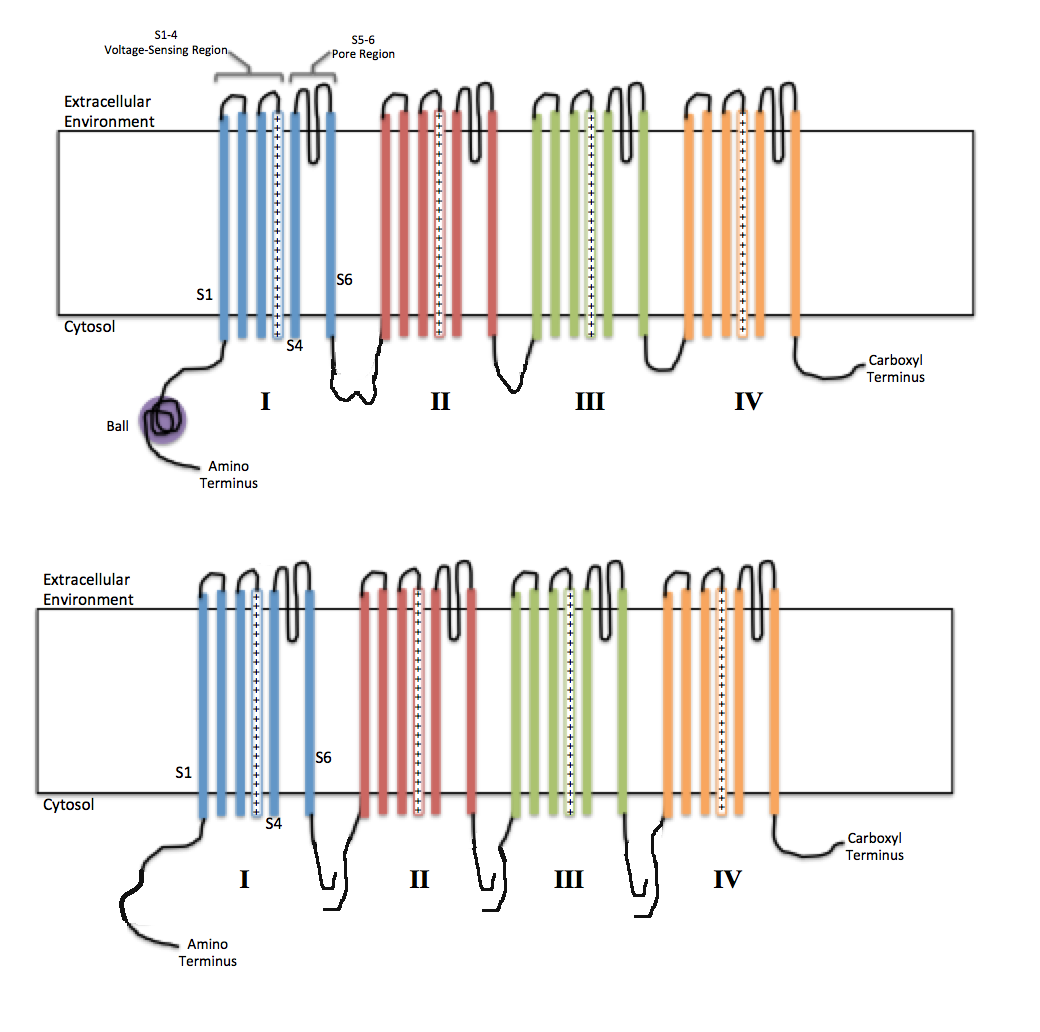
- Each of the four homologous domains makes up one subunit of the ion channel. The S4 voltage-sensing segments (marked with + symbols) are shown as charged.

Identifiers
- Symbol: VIC
- Pfam clan: CL0030
- TCDB: 1.A.1
- OPM superfamily: 8
- OPM protein: 2a79

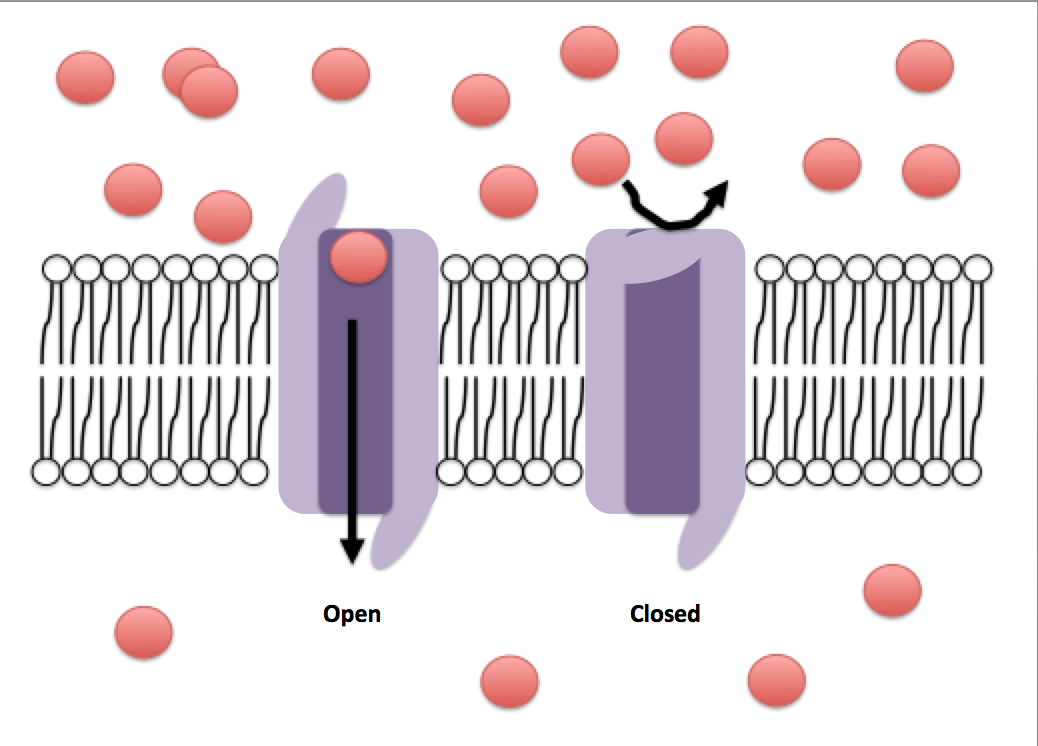
Ions are depicted by the red circles. A gradient is represented by the different concentration of ions on either side of the membrane. The open conformation of the ion channel allows for the translocation of ions across the cell membrane, while the closed conformation does not.

Voltage-gated ion channels are a class of transmembrane proteins that form ion channels that are activated by changes in a cell's electrical membrane potential near the channel. The membrane potential alters the conformation of the channel proteins, regulating their opening and closing. Cell membranes are generally impermeable to ions, thus they must diffuse through the membrane through transmembrane protein channels.

Voltage-gated ion channels have a crucial role in excitable cells such as neuronal and muscle tissues, allowing a rapid and co-ordinated depolarization in response to triggering voltage change. Found along the axon and at the synapse, voltage-gated ion channels directionally propagate electrical signals.

Voltage-gated ion-channels are usually ion-specific, and channels specific to sodium (Na^{+}), potassium (K^{+}), calcium (Ca^{2+}), and chloride (Cl^{−}) ions have been identified. The opening and closing of the channels are triggered by changing ion concentration, and hence charge gradient, between the sides of the cell membrane.

== Structure ==
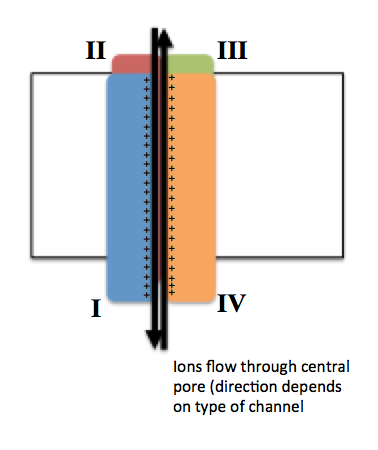
Conformation of the four homologous domains showing the formation of a central pore

Voltage-gated ion channels are generally composed of several subunits arranged in such a way that there is a central pore through which ions can travel down their electrochemical gradients. The channels tend to be ion-specific, although similarly sized and charged ions may sometimes travel through them.

The functionality of voltage-gated ion channels is attributed to its three main discrete units: the voltage sensor, the pore or conducting pathway, and the gate. Na^{+}, K^{+}, and Ca^{2+} channels are composed of four transmembrane domains arranged around a central pore; these four domains are part of a single α-subunit in the case of most Na^{+} and Ca^{2+} channels, whereas there are four α-subunits, each contributing one transmembrane domain, in most K^{+} channels.

Membrane-spanning segments (S1-S6)

The membrane-spanning segments, designated S1-S6, are all alpha helices with specialized functions. The fifth and sixth transmembrane segments (S5 and S6) and pore loop serve the principal role of ion conduction, comprising the gate and pore of the channel, while S1-S4 serve as the voltage-sensing region.

The four subunits may be identical, or different from one another. In addition to the four central α-subunits, there are also regulatory β-subunits, with oxidoreductase activity, which are located on the inner surface of the cell membrane and do not cross the membrane, and which are coassembled with the α-subunits in the endoplasmic reticulum.

== Mechanism ==
Crystallographic structural studies of a potassium channel have shown that, when a potential difference is introduced over the membrane, the associated electric field induces a conformational change in the potassium channel. The conformational change distorts the shape of the channel proteins sufficiently such that the cavity, or channel, opens to allow influx or efflux to occur across the membrane. This movement of ions down their concentration gradients subsequently generates an electric current sufficient to depolarize the cell membrane.

Voltage-gated sodium channels and calcium channels are made up of a single polypeptide with four homologous domains. Each domain contains 6 membrane spanning alpha helices. One of these helices, S4, is the voltage sensing helix. The S4 segment contains many positive charges such that a high positive charge outside the cell repels the helix, keeping the channel in its closed state.

In general, the voltage sensing portion of the ion channel is responsible for the detection of changes in transmembrane potential that trigger the opening or closing of the channel. The S1-4 alpha helices are generally thought to serve this role. In potassium and sodium channels, voltage-sensing S4 helices contain positively-charged lysine or arginine residues in repeated motifs. In its resting state, half of each S4 helix is in contact with the cell cytosol. Upon depolarization, the positively-charged residues on the S4 domains move toward the exoplasmic surface of the membrane. It is thought that the first 4 arginines account for the gating current, moving toward the extracellular solvent upon channel activation in response to membrane depolarization. The movement of 10–12 of these protein-bound positive charges triggers a conformational change that opens the channel. Movement of the voltage-sensor triggers a conformational change of the gate of the conducting pathway, controlling the flow of ions through the channel.

The exact mechanism by which this movement occurs is not currently agreed upon, however the canonical, transporter, paddle, and twisted models are examples of current theories. The canonical model is also known as the sliding-helix model. The model suggests that when the plasma membrane becomes depolarized, the S4 helix shifts outward via either a proteinaceous vestibule or canaliculus by slide or screw like motion. Therefore, the positive charges of the arginine side chain changes position from an inward water pocket to an outward pocket due to the transposition of S4.

The main functional part of the voltage-sensitive protein domain of these channels generally contains a region composed of S3b and S4 helices, known as the "paddle" due to its shape, which appears to be a conserved sequence, interchangeable across a wide variety of cells and species. A similar voltage sensor paddle has also been found in a family of voltage sensitive phosphatases in various species. Genetic engineering of the paddle region from a species of volcano-dwelling archaebacteria into rat brain potassium channels results in a fully functional ion channel, as long as the whole intact paddle is replaced. This "modularity" allows use of simple and inexpensive model systems to study the function of this region, its role in disease, and pharmaceutical control of its behavior rather than being limited to poorly characterized, expensive, and/or difficult to study preparations.

Although voltage-gated ion channels are typically activated by membrane depolarization, some channels, such as inward-rectifier potassium ion channels, are activated instead by hyperpolarization.

The gate is thought to be coupled to the voltage sensing regions of the channels and appears to contain a mechanical obstruction to ion flow. While the S6 domain has been agreed upon as the segment acting as this obstruction, its exact mechanism is unknown. Possible explanations include: the S6 segment makes a scissor-like movement allowing ions to flow through, the S6 segment breaks into two segments allowing of passing of ions through the channel, or the S6 channel serving as the gate itself. The mechanism by which the movement of the S4 segment affects that of S6 is still unknown, however it is theorized that there is a S4-S5 linker whose movement allows the opening of S6.

Inactivation of ion channels occurs within milliseconds after opening. Inactivation is thought to be mediated by an intracellular gate that controls the opening of the pore on the inside of the cell. This gate is modeled as a ball tethered to a flexible chain. During inactivation, the chain folds in on itself and the ball blocks the flow of ions through the channel. Fast inactivation is directly linked to the activation caused by intramembrane movements of the S4 segments, though the mechanism linking movement of S4 and the engagement of the inactivation gate is unknown.

== Different types ==
=== Sodium (Na^{+}) channels ===
Sodium channels have similar functional properties across many different cell types. While ten human genes encoding for sodium channels have been identified, their function is typically conserved between species and different cell types.

=== Calcium (Ca^{2+}) channels ===
With sixteen different identified genes for human calcium channels, this type of channel differs in function between cell types. Ca^{2+} channels produce action potentials similarly to Na^{+} channels in some neurons. They also play a role in neurotransmitter release in pre-synaptic nerve endings. In most cells, Ca^{2+} channels regulate a wide variety of biochemical processes due to their role in controlling intracellular Ca^{2+} concentrations.

=== Potassium (K^{+}) channels ===
Potassium channels are the largest and most diverse class of voltage-gated channels, with over 100 encoding human genes. These types of channels differ significantly in their gating properties; some inactivating extremely slowly and others inactivating extremely quickly. This difference in activation time influences the duration and rate of action potential firing, which has a significant effect on electrical conduction along an axon as well as synaptic transmission. Potassium channels differ in structure from the other channels in that they contain four separate polypeptide subunits, while the other channels contain four homologous domain but on a single polypeptide unit.

=== Chloride (Cl^{−}) channels ===
Chloride channels are present in all types of neurons. With the chief responsibility of controlling excitability, chloride channels contribute to the maintenance of cell resting potential and help to regulate cell volume.

=== Proton (H^{+}) channels ===
Voltage-gated proton channels carry currents mediated by hydrogen ions in the form of hydronium, and are activated by depolarization in a pH-dependent manner. They function to remove acid from cells.

== Diseases ==
- Epilepsy: Abnormal function of the voltage-gated sodium channel Nav1.6 can potentially lead to epilepsy.
- Action potential propagation of different ions
  Heart disease: Voltage-gated ion channels mainly–(Na^{+}), potassium (K^{+}), and calcium (Ca^{2+}) channels, generate cardiac action potentials that begin the cardiac cycle in heart. Disruption of continuous ion flow and dysregulation of action potential signals can cause arrhythmia, or "proarrhythmia".
- Cancer: Voltage-gated ion channels regulate the membrane potential (Vm: Voltage membrane, also known as transmembrane potential), which experiences rhythmic changes during normal cell proliferation. Seminal studies by Clarence D. Cone Jr. in sarcoma cells demonstrated that non-proliferating cells are hyperpolarized, whereas proliferating cells, particularly cancer cells, exhibit a depolarized Vm. The study further showed that hyperpolarization can block mitosis, while depolarization stimulates DNA synthesis and cell division.Thus, dysregulated activity of voltage-gated ion channels contributes to cancer by maintaining membrane potential that favor uncontrolled cell proliferation.

== Phylogenetics ==
Phylogenetic studies of proteins expressed in bacteria revealed the existence of a superfamily of voltage-gated sodium channels. Subsequent studies have shown that a variety of other ion channels and transporters are phylogenetically related to the voltage-gated ion channels, including:

- inwardly rectifying K^{+} channels,
- ryanodine-inositol 1,4,5-triphosphate receptor Ca^{2+} channels,
- transient receptor potential Ca^{2+} channels,
- polycystin cation channels,
- glutamate-gated ion channels,
- calcium-dependent chloride channels,
- monovalent cation:proton antiporters, type 1, and
- potassium transporters.

== See also ==
- Potassium channel
- Catecholaminergic polymorphic ventricular tachycardia
