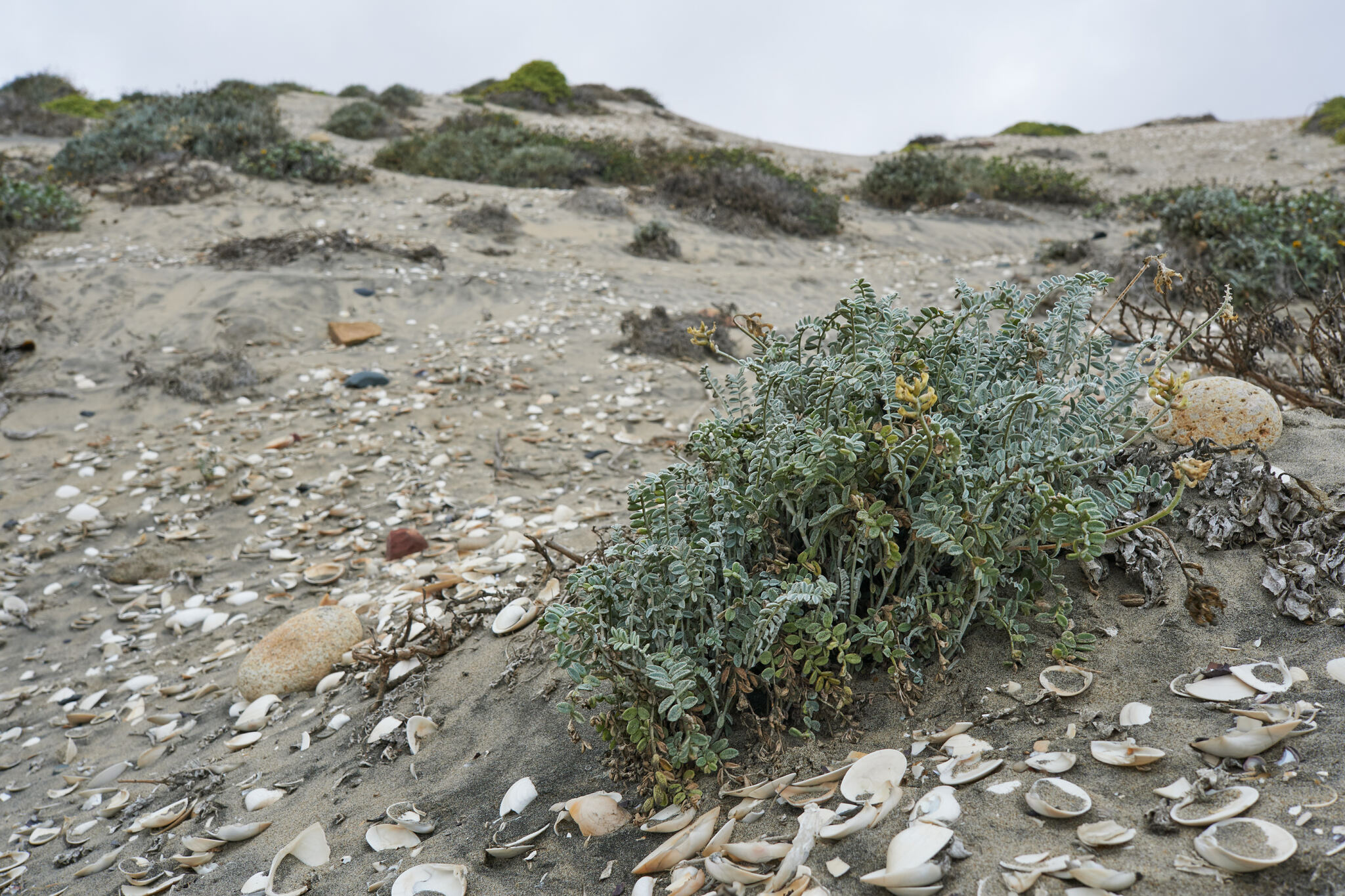

Scientific classification
- Kingdom: Plantae
- Clade: Tracheophytes
- Clade: Angiosperms
- Clade: Eudicots
- Clade: Rosids
- Order: Fabales
- Family: Fabaceae
- Subfamily: Faboideae
- Genus: Astragalus
- Species: A. anemophilus

Binomial name
- Astragalus anemophilus Greene

= Astragalus anemophilus =

Species of milkvetch

Astragalus anemophilus, or San Quintín dune milkvetch, is a species of milkvetch endemic to coastal sand dunes near San Quintin bay in the state of Baja California.

== Description ==
Astragalus anemophilus is a small perennial shrub, with stems often buried in the sand that it grows on. Flowers are a greenish white. Seed pods are purple and roughly 0.5 inches (13 mm)x0.75 inches (19 mm) across.

== Distribution & habitat ==
Astragalus anemophilus is found in coastal sand dune habitat in and around the San Quintín Volcanic Field, including the El Socorro dunes south of San Quintin bay.
