= Vehicle-specific power =

Formalism used in the evaluation of vehicle emissions

The concept of vehicle-specific power (VSP) is a formalism used in the evaluation of vehicle emissions. The idea was first developed by J. L. Jiménez (Jiménez 1998) at the Massachusetts Institute of Technology. Informally, it is the sum of the loads resulting from aerodynamic drag, acceleration, rolling resistance, and hill climbing, all divided by the mass of the vehicle. Conventionally, it is reported in kilowatts per tonne, the instantaneous power demand of the vehicle divided by its mass. VSP, combined with dynamometer and remote-sensing measurements, can be used to determine vehicle emissions.

The United States Environmental Protection Agency held a "modelling shootout" in 2001, to help with the development of its (then) new MOVES (motor vehicle emissions simulator) vehicle emissions model. Two of the four modelling metholodogies in the shootout, one from North Carolina State University (Frey 2002) and one internal to the EPA, used vehicle-specific power metrics. MOVES was eventually implemented using vehicle-specific power as its primary metric. (See Koupal et al. 2002, § 7.1.3.1 for the EPA MOVES draft VSP specification.)

== Formulae ==
Jiménez's own formula is:

$\mathrm{VSP} = \frac{\mathrm{power}}{\mathrm{mass}} = \frac{{\operatorname{d}\over\operatorname{d}t}(E_{\mathrm{kinetic}} + E_{\mathrm{potential}}) + F_{\mathrm{rolling}} \cdot v + F_{\mathrm{aerodynamic}} \cdot v + F_{\mathrm{internal}} \cdot v}{m}$(Jiménez et al. 1999)

VSP can be simplified using typical coefficient values. Haibo Zhai of North Carolina State University provides the following formula for transit buses:

VSP = v × (a + g × sin φ + ψ) + ζ × v^{3}

where:

v
vehicle speed (in metres per second)
a
vehicle acceleration (in metres per second per second)
g
acceleration due to gravity (gee, in metres per second per second)
φ
road grade
ψ
rolling resistance coefficient (metres per second per second)
ζ
drag coefficient (reciprocal metres)
