= ArcLight (biology) =

Genetically-encoded voltage indicator

ArcLight is a genetically-encoded voltage indicator (GEVI) created from Ciona intestinalis voltage sensor and the fluorescent protein super ecliptic pHluorin that carries a critical point mutation (A227D).
