= Christine Essenberg =

Swedish-American marine zoologist and women's education activist

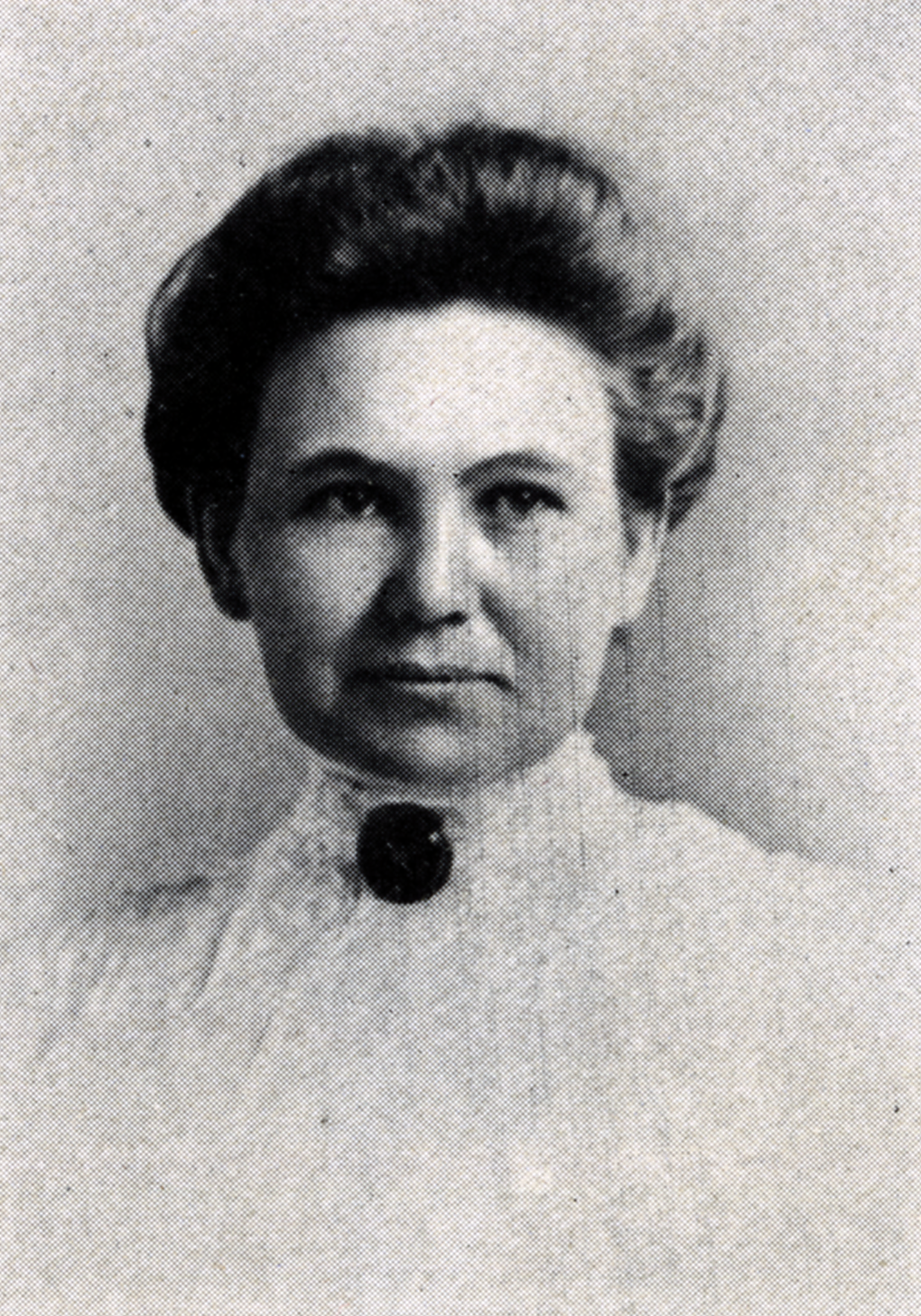
- Born: Christine Elizabeth Abramson; April 6, 1876; Livonia
- Died: 1965 (aged 88–89); San Francisco, California
- Education: Valparaiso University; University of California, Berkeley
- Occupations: Marine Zoologist and Educator
- Employer(s): University of California, Berkeley; Scripps Institution of Oceanography; Scripps Library; Constantinople Women's College; The American School for Girls; Saint Mary's College

Christine Elizabeth Adamson Essenberg (1876–1965) was a Swedish-American marine zoologist, teacher, and advocate for women's education. She became one of the first women to earn a PhD in Zoology from the University of California, Berkeley, and is known for her expertise in polychaetes and plankton studies. Essenberg conducted research at the Scripps Institution of Oceanography and made significant contributions to marine biology by discovering and describing several new species of polychaetes within the Polynoidae and Amphinomidae families, thereby expanding the taxonomy and understanding of marine invertebrates along the Pacific Coast.

In addition to her scientific achievements, Essenberg was a dedicated advocate for women's education. In 1925, she established the American School for Girls in Damascus, Syria, the region's first nonsectarian American girls’ school. The school offered a wide range of educational programs and became a center for women's empowerment, health, and literacy. Despite facing the challenges of the Great Syrian Revolt and World War II, she remained committed to improving educational opportunities for women in the region.

== Early life and education ==
Christine Elizabeth Adamson was born on April 6, 1876, to Swedish parents on a farm in Livonia, then part of the Baltic provinces of the Russian Empire. As a young child, she was adopted by a German noble family and educated by private tutors. Her adopted family discouraged her interest in studying science, adhering to the belief that such subjects were not suitable for girls.

She lived with her adopted family for 20 years on a semi-feudal estate. In 1904, as unrest leading up to the 1905 Russian Revolution spread through the provinces, the estate was burned down. Adamson escaped and stayed with nearby friends for a time. Eventually, she moved to St. Petersburg, where she worked as a language teacher. Up until this point, Adamson had given little thought to the possibility or meaning of revolution, as her background and sheltered upbringing left her disconnected from both the aristocracy and local population.

The upheaval of the First Russian Revolution had a lasting impact on her, shaping her commitment to promoting knowledge and fostering understanding. During this period, as the revolutionary movement continued to grow, Adamson learned that one of her brothers had been executed, and another had fled to America. In 1908, she followed him to the United States, where she began a new chapter of her life.

In America, Adamson found opportunities to pursue the scientific studies that her adoptive family had previously denied to her. She attended Valparaiso University in Indiana, where she studied pedagogy along with various sciences, including zoology and botany. While at Valparaiso, she married fellow student Jacob Essenberg in 1910, but the relationship ended after a few months. After graduating in 1913, she taught at a rural school for a year before continuing her education.

Essenberg pursued graduate studies in Zoology at the University of California, Berkeley, where she earned her master's degree in 1914 and her doctorate in 1917 at the age of 41. She became the sixth woman at the University of California Berkeley to obtain a PhD in zoology. Eventually, she became a naturalized citizen.

== Research and scientific career ==
Essenberg worked as a research biologist at the Zoological Laboratory of the University of California and the Scripps Institution of Oceanography. Her research centered on marine zoology, with a special focus on polychaete worms and plankton. During her graduate studies, she made substantial contributions to the field, notably discovering several new species of marine polychaetes. She discovered and described several new species of polychaetes within the Polynoidae and Amphinomidae families. Essenberg's research proved instrumental in expanding the taxonomy and knowledge of marine invertebrates along the Pacific Coast. Despite her significant contributions, she faced challenges funding and publishing her work compared to her male peers. To support herself, she worked part-time at the Scripps Library. Essenberg eventually earned a faculty position at the University of California and became a member of the California Academy of Sciences.

In 1922–1923, Essenberg undertook a year-long research trip to visit marine laboratories around the globe to advance her plankton studies. She visited marine laboratories such as Woods Hole, Plymouth Marine Laboratory, and the Fort Erin Marine Laboratory on the Isle of Man and met with German scientists in Naples. Upon her return, she began studying appendicularians and co-authored several papers on other marine topics.

== Later career and educational reform ==
At the height of her career as a scientific researcher, she took a sabbatical to teach biology at the Constantinople Women's College in Turkey. During a conversation with a Syrian student, Essenberg became aware of the lack of opportunities for girls and women in Damascus. On her way home from Turkey, she visited Damascus for several months, which gave her the opportunity to learn Arabic and gain a deeper understanding of local customs and culture. There, Essenberg developed a strong interest in the education of Muslim women.

In response to the desire of Arab, Jewish, and Christian parents for a school for their daughters, she promised that Americans would one day open a school there. Upon her return to the United States, Essenberg advocated for the founding of a girls' school in Syria. While many supported the idea, no one was willing to take on the responsibility themselves.

Essenberg left her position at the University of California and shifted her focus to educational reform. After conversations with community members and careful consideration of the complex social and political situation, she decided to establish a school for women of all ages, with a flexible curriculum that could meet the diverse needs of the community. She chose to exclude religious instruction from the curriculum, following the model of the American public school system, while also making the school a social center for women. Her approach was welcomed by both men and women in the community, and she received broad support for her efforts.

The American School for Girls–the first nonsectarian American girls school in Damascus–formally opened on October 5, 1925, amid the escalating Great Syrian Revolt. Just weeks later, Damascus endured a brutal French bombardment that killed hundreds of people, displaced thousands, and destroyed large sections of the city, including parts of the school's courtyard walls. Despite warnings from the American consulate advising all U.S. citizens to leave, Essenberg chose to stay, undeterred by the risks.

The school enrolled children from kindergarten to high school and offered science and language courses in Arabic, French, and English, and also taught Classical Arabic through a special arrangement with local Sheikhs. The school also provided domestic arts, childcare, dance, and public health courses aimed at combating the typhoid fever and malaria epidemics. Essenberg also organized gymnastic courses for students’ mothers. The school functioned as an education, social, recreational, and health center, becoming a significant institution in the region. Many of the graduates went on to become lawyers, doctors, teachers and leaders in the community. A group of students formed the League of American Educations, which raised money for a tuberculosis hospital, collected clothes for those in need, and taught older women how to read and write.

Many former students became teachers at the school, alongside a small number of American and European volunteers. The school struggled financially, and Essenberg worked without pay for her 23-year tenure, supporting herself by teaching private lessons. She also conducted several fundraising tours across the United States, earning recognition and support from prestigious organizations such as the California Academy of Sciences and the American Association of University Women.

Scripps College adopted the American school as its sister college, and several prominent Americans served on the board, including Dr. John Carruthers, Mrs. Francis William Kellogg, Thrysa Amos, Harlow Shapley, Dr. Ray Lyman Wilbur, and Dr. Mary E Wooley.

Essenberg remained in Damascus throughout World War II and transformed part of the school into a recreation area for Allied servicemen and women. The French bombardment of Damascus in 1945 damaged the school's building, but it remained open afterwards.

Essenberg returned to the United States in 1947 and accepted a faculty position at Mount Saint Mary's College in Santa Monica, where she taught German and French. She died in San Francisco in 1965 at the age of 89.

== Personal life ==
Christine Elizabeth Adamson married Jacob Essenberg in 1910, but the couple later divorced.

== Selected publications ==
- Essenberg, C. E. (1915). The habits and natural history of the backswimmers Notonectidae. Journal of Animal Behavior, 5(5), 381–390.
- Essenberg, C. E. (1915). The habits of the water-strider Gerris remiges. Journal of Animal Behavior, 5(5), 397–402.
- Essenberg, C. E. (1917). On some new species of Aphroditidae from the coast of California. University of California Publications in Zoology, 16(22), 401–430.
- Essenberg, C. E. (1917). Description of some new species of Polynoidae from the coast of California. University of California Publications in Zoology, 18(3), 45–60.
- Essenberg, C. E. (1917). New species of Amphinomidae from the Pacific Coast. University of California Publications in Zoology, 18(4), 61–74.
- Essenberg, C. E. (1918). The factors controlling the distribution of the Polynoidae of the Pacific Coast of North America. University of California Publications in Zoology, 18(11), 171–238.
- Essenberg, C. E. (1919). The pteropod Desmopterus pacificus sp. nov. University of California Publications in Zoology, 19(2), 85–88.
- Essenberg, C. E. (1922). The seasonal distribution of the Appendicularians in the region of San Diego, California. Ecology, 3(1), 55–64.
- Essenberg, C. E. (1922). Stylarioides papillosa sp. nov. A new annelid from the San Diego region. University of California Publications in Zoology, 22(6), 379–381.
- Essenberg, C. E. (1924). The incomplete digestive tract of Appendicularia sicula. University of California Publications in Zoology, 26(14), 263–265.
- Essenberg, C. E. (1926). Copelata from the San Diego region. University of California Publications in Zoology, 28(22), 399–521.
- Essenberg, C. E. (1926). Observations on gradual disintegration and death of Copelata. University of California Publications in Zoology, 28(22), 523–525.
