= Lidia Mannuzzu =

Italian biologist (1958–2016)

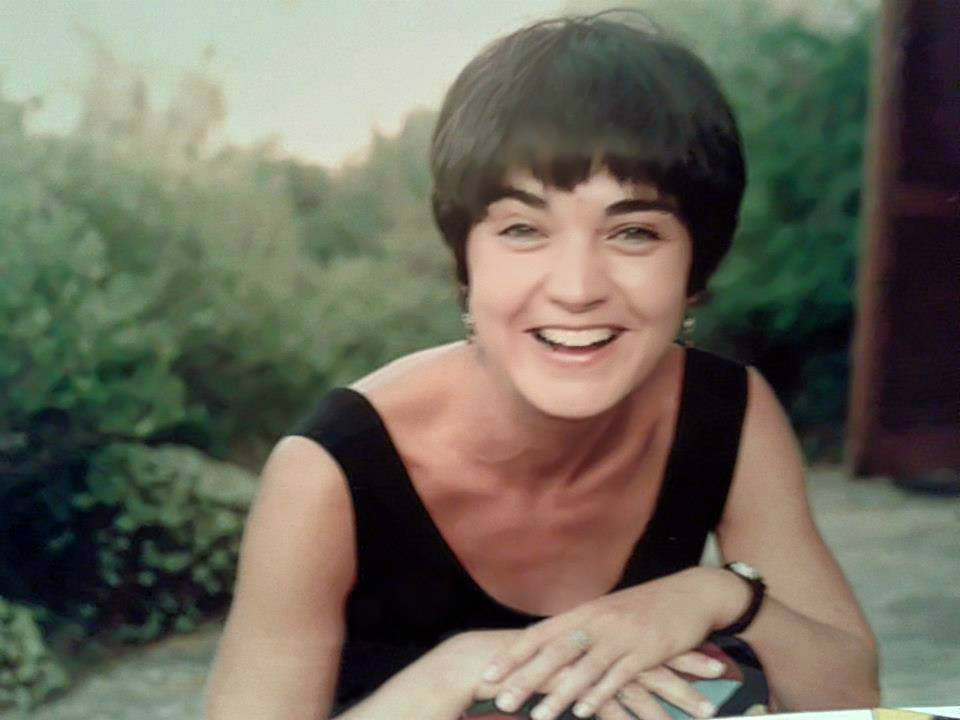
- Born: 21 April 1958; Sassari, Sardinia
- Died: 24 October 2016 (aged 58); Sassari, Sardinia
- Education: University of Sassari; University of California, Berkeley
- Scientific career
- Fields: Biology
- Workplaces: University of Turin, University of California, Berkeley, Nano Med Technology, University of Sassari
- Theses: Spin label studies of urea transport (1989); Characterization of the urea transport system in human erythrocytes (1994)

Lidia Mannuzzu (21 April 1958 – 24 October 2016) was an Italian biologist, physiologist and academic.

== Early years ==
Lidia M. Mannuzzu was born in Sassari, Sardinia, Italy. She was the daughter of the writer Salvatore Mannuzzu; and she had a sister, Mary. Mannuzzu graduated with honors in Medicine from University of Sassari in 1984, with a thesis on favism. She continued her studies at the Max Planck Institute, at Brunel University in London, and Aachen Medical School in Westphalia.

Immediately after graduation and until 1986, she worked as a researcher in the Department of Biochemistry and Genetics, University of Turin, participating in research on cell membrane of platelets and blood cells that have a fundamental role in hemostasis.

== University of California, Berkeley ==
In 1987, she left Italy to pursue a master's degree in physiology at University of California, Berkeley, receiving her Ph.D. in 1990. During the 1990s, with her colleagues Mario Morrone and Ehud Isacoff, she studied the voltage-gated ion channel in cells. The three researchers developed a new technique to monitor the movement of different amino acids in the ion channel proteins of cell membranes by tagging them with fluorophores. The change of the fluorescence of the amino acid probes after electrical stimulation (and related responses by the involved membrane proteins) provided the first real-time measure of protein motion in the channel’s voltage sensor.

She developed and patented biomedical technologies targeted to the red blood cells processes, and of nervous system cell function. In 2000, as a researcher, she became a professor at Berkeley, continuing to study the workings of synapses. In 2005, she left Berkeley to found Nano Med Technology, a company that studied the use of new drugs for diseases associated with dysfunction of cellular membranes.

Many of her studies were published in journals such as PNAS (the official publication of the National Academy of Sciences in the United States), Nature, and Science.

== Return to Italy ==
Mannuzzu returned to Italy in 2006, with the support of a Ministry of scientific research program for the return of Italian emigrants from abroad. She continued her research work in the Department of Biomedical Sciences at the University of Sassari, where she studied the relationship between the diseases of red blood cells and thalassemia.

She died on 24 October 2016, from a pulmonary embolism.

== Patent ==
- Patent n. 5,756,351, 13 January 1997. Biomolecular optical sensors.

== Selected works ==
- Conformational switch between slow and fast gating modes: allosteric regulation of voltage sensor mobility in the EAG K+ channel. Roland Schönherr, Lidia M Mannuzzu, Ehud Y Isacoff, Stefan H Heinemann. Neuron 35:935-49 2002-10-09
- Structural rearrangements in single ion channels detected optically in living cells. AloisSonnleitner, Lidia M Mannuzzu, Susumu Terakawa, Ehud Y Isacoff. Proceedings of the National Academy of Sciences of the United States of America 99:12759-64 2002-09-12
- Independence and Cooperativity in Rearrangements of a Potassium Channel Voltage Sensor Revealed by Single Subunit Fluorescence
- Increased Red Cell Calcium, Decreased Calcium Adenosine Triphosphatase, and Altered Membrane Proteins During Fava Bean Hemolysis in Glucose-6-Phosphate Dehydrogenase-Deficient (Mediterranean Variant) Individuals, By Franco Turrini, Anna Naitana, Lidia Mannuzzu, Gianpiero Pescarmona, and Paolo Arese
- Estimate of the number of urea transport sites in erythrocyte ghosts using a hydrophobic mercurial
