= Voltage sensitive phosphatase =

Class of enzymes

Identifiers
- Symbol: VSP
- OPM superfamily: 447
- OPM protein: 4g80

Voltage sensitive phosphatases or voltage sensor-containing phosphatases, commonly abbreviated VSPs, are a protein family found in many species, including humans, mice, zebrafish, frogs, and sea squirt.

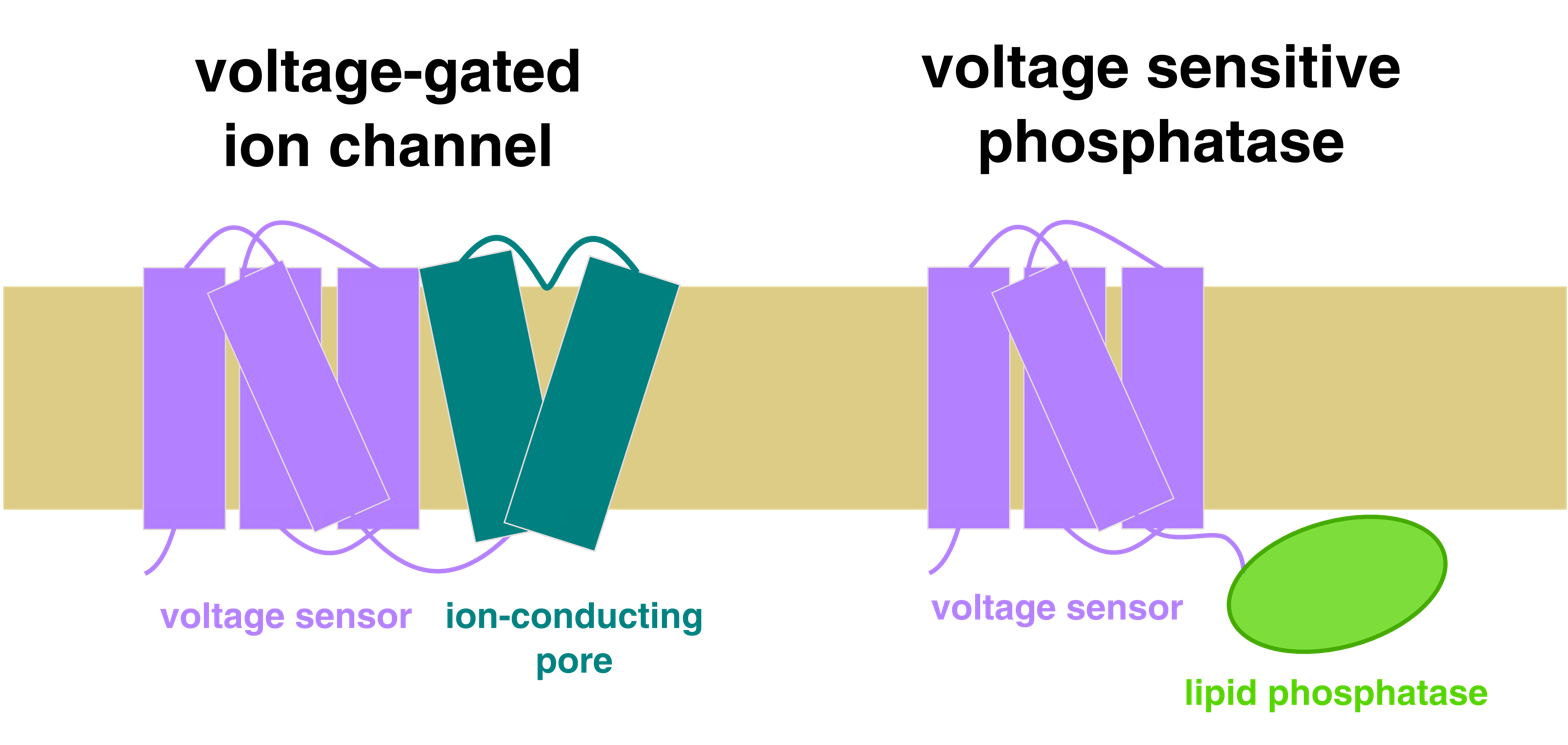
a cartoon comparison of voltage-gated ion channels and VSPs

== Discovery ==
The first voltage-sensitive phosphatase was discovered as a result of a genome-wide search in the sea squirt Ciona intestinalis. The search was designed to identify proteins which contained a sequence of amino acids called a voltage sensor, because this sequence of amino acids confers voltage sensitivity to voltage-gated ion channels. Although the initial genomic analysis was primarily concerned with the evolution of voltage-gated ion channels, one of the results of the work was the discovery of the VSP protein in sea squirt, which was termed Ci-VSP.

The homologues to Ci-VSP in mammals are called Transmembrane phosphatases with tensin homology, or TPTEs. TPTE (now also called hVSP2) and the closely related TPIP (also called TPTE2 or hVSP1) were identified before the discovery of Ci-VSP, however no voltage-dependent activity was described in the initial reports of these proteins. Subsequently, computational methods were used to suggest that these proteins may be voltage sensitive, however Ci-VSP is still widely regarded as the first-identified VSP.

== Species and tissue distribution ==
VSPs are found across animals and choanoflagellates, though lost from nematodes and insects. Humans contain two members, TPTE and TPTE2, which result from a primate-specific duplication . Most reports indicate that VSPs are found primarily in reproductive tissue, especially the testis. Other VSPs discovered include: Dr-VSP (zebrafish Danio rerio, 2008, 2022), Gg-VSP (chicken Gallus gallus domesticus, 2014), Xl-VSP1, Xl-VSP2, and Xt-VSP (frogs: X. laevis and X. tropicalis, 2011), TPTE (mouse), etc.

Following the discovery of Ci-VSP, the nomenclature used for naming these proteins consists of two letters corresponding to the initials of the species name, followed by the acronym VSP. For the human VSPs, it has been suggested the adoption of the names Hs-VSP1 and Hs-VSP2 when referring to TPIP and TPTE, respectively.

== Structure and function ==
VSPs are made up of two protein domains: a voltage sensor domain, and a phosphatase domain coupled to a lipid-binding C2 domain.

=== The voltage sensor ===
A cartoon depicting movement of the S4 segment of a voltage sensor in response to depolarization.

The voltage sensor domain contains four transmembrane helices, named S1 through S4. The S4 transmembrane helix contains a number of positively charged arginine and lysine amino acid residues. Voltage sensitivity in VSPs is generated primarily by these charges in the S4, in much the same way that voltage-gated ion channels are gated by voltage. When positive charge builds up on one side of a membrane containing such voltage sensors, it generates an electric force pressing the S4 in the opposite direction. Changes in membrane potential therefore move the S4 back and forth through the membrane, allowing the voltage sensor to act like a switch. Activation of the voltage sensor occurs at depolarized potentials, i.e.: when the membrane collects more positive charge on the inner leaflet. Conversely, deactivation of the voltage sensor takes place at hyperpolarized potentials, when the membrane collects more negative charge on the inner leaflet. Activation of the voltage sensor increases the activity of the phosphatase domain, while deactivation of the voltage sensor decreases phosphatase activity.

=== The phosphatase ===
The phosphatase domain in VSPs is highly homologous to the tumor suppressor PTEN, and acts to remove phosphate groups from phospholipids in the membrane containing the VSP. Phospholipids such as inositol phosphates are signaling molecules which exert different effects depending on the pattern in which they are phosphorylated and dephosphorylated. Therefore, the action of VSPs is to indirectly regulate processes dependent on phospholipids.

The main substrate that has been characterized so far for VSPs (including hVSP1 but not hVSP2/TPTE, which shows no phosphatase activity) is phosphatidylinositol 4,5-bisphosphate, which VSPs dephosphorylate at the 5' position. However, VSP activity has been reported against other phosphoinositides as well, including phosphatidylinositol (3,4,5)-trisphosphate, which is also dephosphorylated at the 5' position. Activity against the 3-phosphate of PI(3,4)P_{2} has also been demonstrated; this activity seems to become apparent at high membrane potentials, at lower potentials the 5'-phosphatase activity is predominant.

=== X-ray crystal structures ===
This morph was created in Chimera using the Ci-VSP PDB structures 3V0D, 3V0F, 4G7V, and 4G80. The catalytic domain is shown in pink, and the voltage sensing domain is in blue. The red residues are the arginines in S4, and the blue residue shows the glutamate in the proposed gating loop, regulating access to the catalytic cysteine (shown in orange). A part of the missing region between the two domains was modeled using the CPHmodels 3.2 server (shown in grey).

X-ray crystallography has been used to generate high-resolution images of the two domains of Ci-VSP, separate from one another. By introducing small mutations in the protein, researchers have produced crystal structures of both the voltage sensing domain and the phosphatase domain from Ci-VSP in what are thought to be the "on" and "off" states. These structures have led to a model of VSP activation where movement of the voltage sensor affects a conformational change in a "gating loop," moving a glutamate residue in the gating loop away from the catalytic pocket of the phosphatase domain to increase phosphatase activity.

== Uses in research and in biology ==
VSPs have been used as a tool to manipulate phospholipids in experimental settings. Because membrane potential can be controlled using patch clamp techniques, placing VSPs in a membrane allows for experimenters to rapidly dephosphorylate substrates of VSPs. VSPs' voltage sensors have also been used to engineer various types of genetically encoded voltage indicator (GEVI). These probes allow experimenters to visualize voltage in membranes using fluorescence. However, the normal role which VSPs play in the body is still not well understood.

== See also ==
- Gating (electrophysiology)
- Genetically encoded voltage indicator
- Ion channel
- Phosphatase
