= Arclight (novel) =

2003 novel by Josin L. McQuein

- First edition
- Author: Josin L. McQuein
- Cover artist: Christian Fünfhausen
- Language: English
- Series: Arclight
- Genre: Young adult, Dystopian, Science fiction
- Published: April 23rd, 2013
- Publisher: Greenwillow Books
- Media type: Print (Hardcover, Paperback, Kindle, and Audiobook)
- Pages: 403
- ISBN: 9780062130143
- OCLC: 962200929
- Followed by: Arclight

Arclight is a science fiction, dystopian, young adult novel series by Texan author Josin L. McQuein. The first book, Arclight, was published in April 2013 by Greenwillow Books, an imprint of HarperCollins Publishers. According to WorldCat, the book is in 621 libraries. The second book in the series, Meridian, was published in 2014. The story follows Marina, a teenage amnesiac in an unwelcoming post-apocalyptic American military base by the name of Arclight. As the tale progresses, Marina makes astounding discoveries and unlikely friends on her journey to discover who she was, and where she belongs.

== Synopsis ==
"The first rule of the Arclight is Light is safety: light is life. Within the walls of light, people are protected from the Fade- the creatures that have destroyed the world. The second rule is Never go outside alone. The third: No one ever comes back from the dark. But Marina did. She doesn't know who she is or where she came from. And she doesn't know how she survived the Fade. Or why they want her back. But they want her back. And the attacks on the Arclight won't stop until they have her. What secrets are locked inside Marina's memory? Where does she belong?"

- Arclight. Back cover.

No one survives the Fade. But, Marina did. The only problem is, she doesn't quite remember how. In fact, she doesn't remember anything. Ever since she was discovered in the Grey, a barren stretch of land that acts as a line between the Light and the Dark, by a small group of people and brought to the Arclight, Marina has been living a pain and confusion. Unknown to all of Arclight, Marina lives alone, rejected by her classmates for her status as Fade-bait, a title she received as a result of her arrived prompting constant blue light warnings (blue lights mean something has breached the perimeter). Marina has only one friend, a bubbly, chatty girl by the name of Anne-Marie, and a questionable acquaintance, Tobin. Tobin, whose father was a part of the team that retrieved her from the Grey. Tobin whose father didn't return while she did.

One day, the alarms in Arclight sounded, flashing red (a Red-Wall alarm) to let them know that the perimeter has been breached. The Fade has gotten inside of the compound. Marina and her class evacuate, with their teacher, Mr. Pace, in the lead with a gun. Tobin, much to Marina's surprise, is her crutch as they rush around the compound. However, he is quick to disappear after the danger is gone. Later, he is also quick to reappear in defense of Marina, who was being harassed by a particularly violent classmate. Upon confronting Tobin, Marina spots a Fade and the alarm is hit. In an instant, the corridor goes red, and Tobin has it pinned to the flow all while he throws punches at it. However, he is unable to completely restrain it and it gets out of his grip. As it escapes, the Fade's eyes meet Marina's, and it feels familiar to her. Being dealt with unfavorable cards, the Fade chooses to surrender.

Upon its capture, the Fade is taken to the basement, or more specifically, the White Room, a quarantine area hidden deep underground. After being shown passages that lead throughout the Arclight, Marina and Tobin debate using them to go see the Fade. But, before they can, they are brought to the White Room by Mr. Pace. It is in this room, that they are re-acquainted with the captured Fade. Through memories regained, Marina learns that before she had been found in the Grey, she had been hiding from someone in a lake. And upon her return, she had been held in the same quarantined area as the Fade was in currently. The Fade and Marina hold a mental conversation in which many things are revealed. The Fade is searching for its mate, Cherish, and he offers repentance and asks for aid in his search. Aid from Marina.

After her departure from the White Room, the Fade has been constantly invaded Marina's mind. The Fade begs her to remember, to recollect, to locate, to release, to understand, and to find Cherish. In an attempt to block it out, Marina goes to Tobin, who provides her with the means to temporarily do so. They fall asleep together, watching the stars. Marina wakes up to discover the Fade watching them. After being dealt an ultimatum, Marina leaves with the Fade, who she decides to call Rue.

Marina goes into the Dark with Rue. In the Dark, she gains the knowledge that the Fade are not as they seem. They are symbionts, a hive. They are together. They are connected. And they don't understand why humans are not. Suddenly, the Fade gather, and their voices overwhelm Marina. Her leg begins to burn around the spot where she was shot in the Grey. In an attempt to heal it, Rue shares his blood with Marina by forcing it into her wound. An unknown amount of time later, they are found by Anne-Marie, Tobin, the Fade-turned mother of one of her classroom tormentors, and Tobin's father, who is now also a Fade. Marina passes out, only to dream of running away of the events that lead to her being taken to the Arclight. She was hiding in a lake, but not from the Fade. She was hiding from the humans. The same humans who shot her in the leg to prevent her from returning to the Fade, and to Rue, who had been running to meet her.

When she awakes, Marina finds that everyone the Arclight has lost have been out in the Dark, completely fine and human. The blue alerts that had been plaguing the Arclight since her arrival had been their own people trying to find a way back in. In fact, the information she is told seems to be rewriting all of what she has ever known. She is introduced to the sister of Cherish, Blanca. A Fade-born child. Until recently, Marina had been unaware that Fade could be anyone but the infested bodies of humans. Marina is then asked by Rue what the stitched letters on her jacket are. When she tells him they spell out her name, he denies this by claiming that he has seen that lettering elsewhere and that Marina is not her real name. Marina is dead water, but she is not dead water. Marina is confused, but upon thinking more on it, Marina takes off running towards the lake where she had been originally discovered. Marina frantically digs for what Rue claims to have had her name on it, her desperate actions causing concern to all but Rue, who laughs and smiles happily by her side. The air vibrates with the connected joy of the Fade. Suddenly, Marina emerges with a large board and hugs it to her chest. On the board Cypress Hill Marina is written. She is not Marina, the lake is. Suddenly, her memories flood her. Memories of others talking about her, naming her Marina. Once she emerges from her memories, she feels connected to the Fade, and strongly connected to Rue. Marina has found Cherish.

Marina is a Fade. Marina is Cherish. Cherish who is a Fade and Rue's mate. However, they are still separate. There is a line in her head that separates the two of them. Not together, but not apart either. She is shocked by the knowledge that she was stolen from her home and returned to a place she had never been before. Tobin's father expresses his extreme apologies at this. They had believed she was a human turned Fade, not vice versa. As she takes all of it in, an argument between Rue and Tobin begins on whether or not she will be staying with the Fade or returning to Arclight. Suddenly, Cherish clings onto Rue, an action that is happily reciprocated. And it is in that embrace that she realizes, while she may be Cherish, Cherish is no longer her.

It is time for everyone to return home. Both Rue and Tobin wish for her to return with them to their respective homes. It is soon agreed that she will return to Arclight if only to prove that the Fade are not infested humans. She believes that this way the humans will stop hunting them. Once arriving at the border of the Arclight, they are able to gain entrance by proving that they still bleed red, as if you are a Fade you supposedly bleed black.

In the White Room, she and Tobin discover recordings of the time Cherish spent in the quarantined area. The focus of these recordings was the procedures used to rid her of her Fade characteristics. While they are distracted by the recordings, they are interrupted by Honoria, the leader of Arclight and the one in charge of all the experiments done on Cherish. They attempt to convince Honoria of the true nature of the Fade. Unfortunately, they are unsuccessful. Through their attempt, they discover that Honoria knew all along that the Fade could have children of their own. And that Marina had been born a Fade. However, Honoria believes that the Fade are nothing but an infection to be rid of. That they have no right to breed or to live.

It is then that it is revealed to Honoria that all those who were lost to the Dark were, in fact, completely alive and unharmed. Seconds later, classmates of Marinas can be seen destroying the lights that surround the Arclight. As they vacate the room, Tobin and Marina split up after being halted by Mr. Pace, Tobin goes to find his dad and Marina stays behind to hold him back. After somewhat convinces Mr. Pace and Anne-Marie's mother that they are not Fade, they rush towards the hospital, where a perimeter is being established.

After reaching the hospital, they quickly discover that they are unable to gain access as the area has been quarantined. As they debate this and communicate with those on the inside, Honoria makes an appearance. Honoria begins explaining the reasons behind her actions, however, when she is approached by a Fade who is revealed to be her brother, she shoots him in the shoulder. Now that she is trigger happy, Honoria quickly aims at a new target and fires. The bullet hits Tobin in the chest. Marina begs Rue to heal Tobin, but Rue is reluctant as he believes once Tobin is gone everything will return to as it was. That Cherish will return with him. Once Marina forces the realization that she is no longer the Cherish he knew upon him, Rue agrees to heal Tobin, his rival, for her. Shortly after, Marina faints.

Upon awakening, Marina is met with a healed Tobin who has a new respect for Rue after the Fade saved his life. Tobin informs her that Rue left shortly after he awoke and that Honoria is being dealt with. Marina looks forward to the promise of something new over the horizon.

== Setting ==
The first book of the Arclight series takes place in a military base called Arclight in post-apocalyptic America. The Arclight, as its name implies, is surrounded by a ring of high powered lights to keep out the Faded, evil creatures that roam "the dark." The Dark refers to the area outside Arclight and out of its light. Between Arclight and the Dark is an area known as the Grey: a desolate, sad place that is similar to twilight, the area between light and dark.

== Characters ==
Marina "Fade-Bait": Marina is a teenage amnesiac who ends up in Arclight after being discovered in the Grey whilst hiding in a lake. Her arrival in Arclight elicits an increase in Blue-light drills, prompting her classmates to bequeath her with the name Fade-Bait. Marina is a headstrong and instinctual girl, though sometimes to a fault. She is determined to locate her forgotten memories with, or without the help of others. On the path of doing so, she gains many friends, as well as a few surprising acquaintances.

Cherish: Cherish is a Fade-born teenager and the mate of Rue. She is the past of Marina. Cherish is also an instinctual being and she holds great love and care for her hive. Especially, for Rue and her younger sister Blanca.

Rue: Rue is the first Fade we are introduced to. He is the mate of Cherish and her great rescuer. Rue is on a mission to find Cherish, who was taken from their home and brought to the Arclight. He believes that with Marina's assistance, Cherish can be remembered and found. Rue has great protective instincts towards those he holds dear, for example, Blanca and Cherish, as well as the rest of his hive.

Anne-Marie: Anne-Marie is Marina's best friend. She is a happy and chatty soul with a caring mother and a brother by the name of Trey. Anne-Marie was the first to befriend Marina after her arrival at Arclight and holds her place as Marina's loyal friend throughout the novel.

Tobin Lutrell: Tobin is the teenage son of James Lutrell, a man who was part of the team that was sent to retrieve marina from the Grey. However, while Marina returned, Tobin's father did not. Because of this, up until the very first Red-Wall alarm, Tobin gave Marina a wide berth. After the Red-Wall alarm and the events that progressed afterward however, Tobin and Marina became much closer. Tobin is hotheaded and a dreamer. Despite his outward appearance, he spends much of his time leafing through the magazines in his apartment, gazing at snow globes, and examining the stars.

Honoria Whit: Honoria is the leader of Arclight, and has been for longer than anyone thought. She was a child when the fall of the world began and humans were forced into shelters. Honoria has a bullheaded nature that prevents her from accepting the Fade in any way, shape, or form. She has spent many years burning horrific scars onto her skin just to rid herself of any lingering contact between her and the Fade from decades ago. Honoria is the culprit between Marina's separation from her past as Cherish. She is on a mission to regain ground against the Fade.
