= Jean L. Turner =

Astrophysicist

- Education: Harvard University (A.B. Astronomy); UC Berkeley (Ph.D. Astronomy)
- Scientific career
- Fields: Astrophysics
- Workplaces: University of California, Los Angeles

Jean L. Turner is an astrophysicist and distinguished professor in the Department of Physics and Astronomy at the University of California, Los Angeles. She was lead author on research and discovery of a particular star cluster in the dwarf galaxy NGC 5253, considered "remarkable" for being an extremely dusty gas cloud and having highly efficient star formation.

== Career ==
Turner received her AB in astronomy from Harvard University and her PhD degree in astronomy from UC Berkeley. She was a Center for Astrophysics | Harvard & Smithsonian Fellow (1984-1986), a visiting associate at Caltech (2004), Caroline Herschel visiting fellow at Space Telescope (2007), and visiting scientist at the Joint ALMA Observatory (2011). Turner was elected a fellow of the American Association for the Advancement of Science in 2006, and the UCLA Physics and Astronomy Department chair from 2014 to 2018.

She is an active member of the International Astronomical Union, and has also contributed to the development and commissioning of the Hat Creek Millimeter Interferometer and the Atacama Large Millimeter/Submillimeter Array.

== Research areas ==
Her research specialty is in the gaseous environments of young 'super star clusters' in local galaxies, including O star winds and star formation efficiency. The youngest star clusters are typically embedded in dusty gas clouds, and therefore hidden from optical telescopes, so observations are done with infrared and millimeter wavelength telescopes. Such studies can help explain the differences in early Milky Way and Population III stars.
