= Charles F. Harbison =

American entomologist

- Entomologist Charles F. Harbison (Photo: San Diego Natural History Museum Research Library)
- Born: 12 January 1904; National City, California, United States
- Died: September 5, 1989 (aged 85); San Diego, California, United States
- Education: University of California, Berkeley
- Scientific career
- Fields: Entomology
- Workplaces: San Diego Natural History Museum

Charles F. Harbison (1904–1989) was an American entomologist and the curator of entomology at the San Diego Natural History Museum from 1942 to 1969. An avid field naturalist and researcher, Harbison influenced a generation of San Diego-born scientists in many fields of natural history through the Junior Naturalist program at the museum.

== Biography ==
Charles Francis Harbison was born on January 12, 1904, in National City, California, to Carrie Lincoln Floyd and David F. Harbison. He was descended from San Diego County pioneer families: his paternal grandfather, John S. Harbison, was a commercially successful beekeeper; his maternal grandfather, Ira Floyd, was among the earliest settlers (a fruit rancher) in National City, south of San Diego. Harbison grew up in National City and (briefly) in the Imperial Valley, where his father was a farmer and poultry rancher and provided sightseeing tours into Baja, California. After a year attending San Diego State College, Harbison moved to Los Angeles and worked in the Los Angeles School's Division of Nature Study for five years, attending classes at the University of California southern branch (now UCLA). He went on to study entomology at the University of California, Berkeley, under Professors E.O. Essig, S. B. Freeborn, and W. B. Herms and invertebrate zoology under Joseph Grinnell, taking his B.A. degree in 1933.

Harbison returned to San Diego following the death of his father. In 1934, Harbison was hired (via WPA funding) by the Entomology Department of the San Diego Natural History Museum. Throughout the Depression, Harbison maintained the museum's entomology collections and participated in many of the museum's research expeditions, including field work in Baja California, Organ Pipe National Monument (working as assistant to zoologist and Curator of Birds and Mammals Laurence M. Huey), and other sites in southwestern Arizona.

From 1939 to 1949, Harbison conducted nature study programs at the museum for the San Diego City Schools. In 1943, when the U.S. Navy occupied the museum, Harbison moved part of the entomology collection and his junior naturalist educational materials to the Brooklyn Grammar School in San Diego, maintaining a "Children's Museum," teaching, and leading field trips for young naturalists throughout the war.

After the war, Harbison resumed his research expeditions, studying insects (especially Odonata) and plants of Baja California, and focused his collecting on the Cañon del Cantil (Cantillas and its north fork, Tajo Cañon) in the Sierra de Juarez. Harbison participated in extended research trips from 1952 to 1968, including five visits to Guadalupe Island, Mexico and the 1958 Scripps Institution of Oceanography expedition to Barro Colorado Island, Panama, and Clipperton Island, Mexico. On Clipperton Island (a desolate atoll 900 miles south of Baja California), Harbison found 13 orders of insects as well as spiders and other arthropods. In 1962, Harbison was a member of the Belvedere Expedition to the Gulf of California, an important ecological survey of 32 islands; on that expedition, he amassed a collection of 10,000 arthropod specimens for the museum.

While Harbison's scientific publications are limited in number, the variety of his natural history interests is reflected in the patronyms proposed in his honor, including those of two plants, Verbena harbisonii Moldenke, 1940 (now Glandularia lilacina), and Astragalus harbisonii Barneby, 1953; a mouse, Peromyscus guardia harbisoni Banks, 1967; a bee, Centris harbisoni Snelling, 1974; a butterfly, Euphyes vestris harbisoni Brown and McGuire, 1983; a yucca skipper, Megathymus yuccae harbisoni J. & T. Emmel, 1998; and a scorpion, Vaejovis (now Serradigitus) harbisoni Williams, 1970.

Harbison died on September 5, 1989, in San Diego, California.

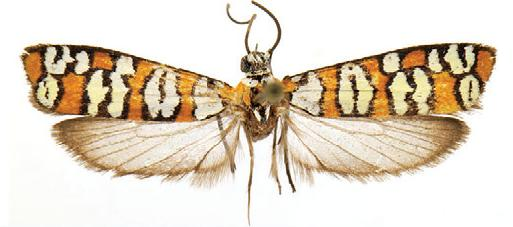
Atteva exquisita

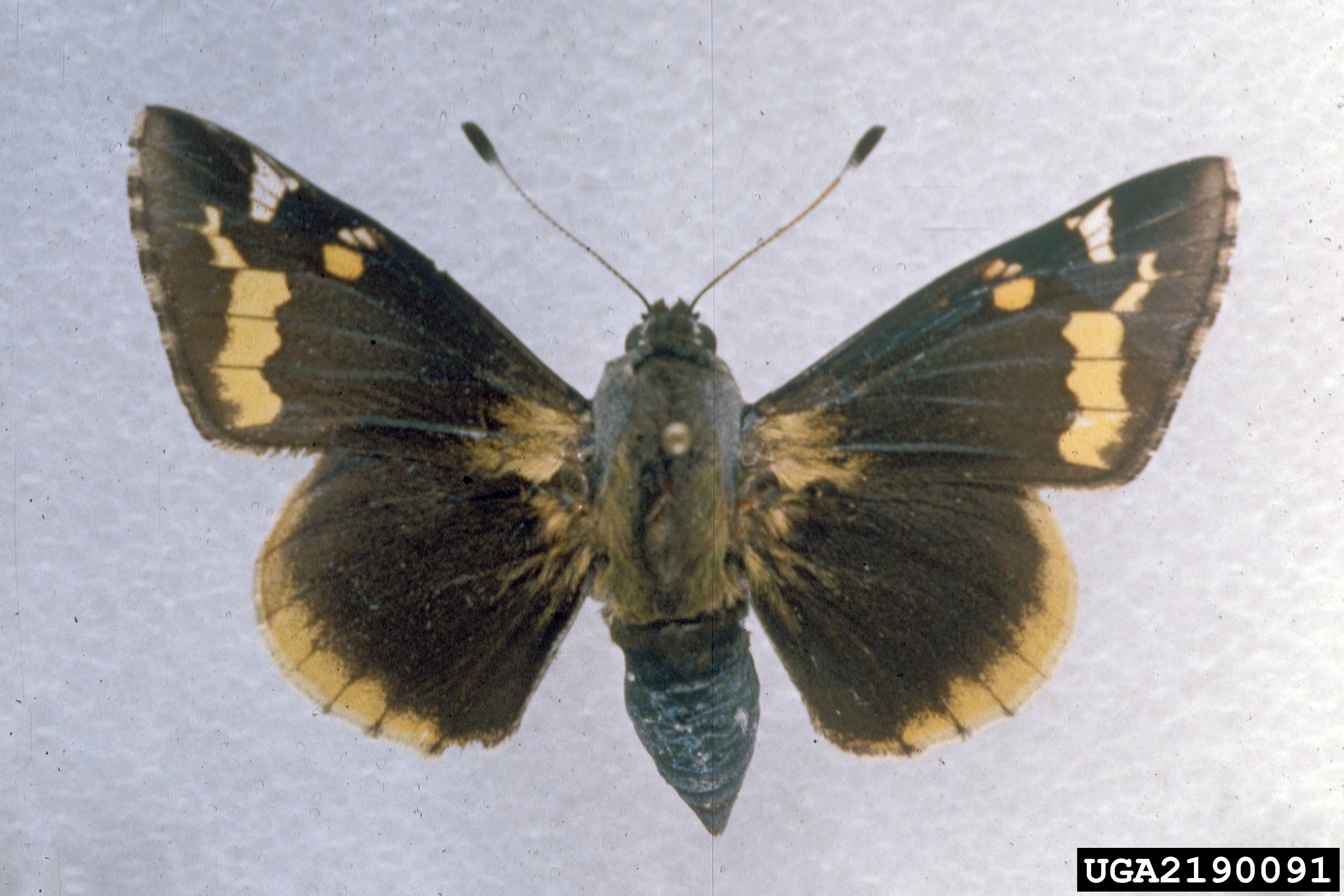
Megathymus yuccae.

== Selected bibliography ==
- Harbison, Charles F. (1957). "A new species of Megathymus from Baja California, Mexico (Lepidoptera: Megathymidae)". Transactions of the San Diego Society of Natural History. 12 (12).
- Harbison, Charles F. (1963). "A second new species of Megathymid from Baja California, Mexico; (Lepidoptera: Megathymidae)". Transactions of the San Diego Society of Natural History. 13 (4).
- Powell, Jerry A.; Comstock, John A.; Harbison, Charles F. (1973). "Biology, geographical distribution, and status of Atteva exquisita (Lepidoptera: Yponomeutidae)". Transactions of the San Diego Society of Natural History. 17: 175–186.
- Harbison, Charles F. (1927). "A Day on Santa Cruz Island". Los Angeles School Journal. X (37): 25–27.
