= Ion transporter superfamily =

Identifiers
- Symbol: IT
- Pfam clan: CL0182
- ECOD: 3355.1.1
- OPM superfamily: 272
- OPM protein: 4r1i

The ion transporter (IT) superfamily is a superfamily of secondary carriers that transport charged substrates.

== Families ==
As of early 2016, the currently recognized and functionally defined families that make up the IT superfamily include:

- 2.A.8 - The Gluconate:H^{+} Symporter (GntP) Family
- 2.A.11 - The Citrate-Mg^{2+}:H^{+} (CitM) Citrate-Ca^{2+}:H^{+} (CitH) Symporter (CitMHS) Family
- 2.A.13 - The C_{4}-Dicarboxylate Uptake (Dcu) Family
- 2.A.14 - The Lactate Permease (LctP) Family
- 2.A.34 - The NhaB Na^{+}:H^{+} Antiporter (NhaB) Family
- 2.A.35 - The NhaC Na^{+}:H^{+} Antiporter (NhaC) Family
- 2.A.45 - The Arsenite-Antimonite (ArsB) Efflux Family
- 2.A.47 - The Divalent Anion:Na^{+} Symporter (DASS) Family
- 2.A.61 - The C_{4}-dicarboxylate Uptake C (DcuC) Family
- 2.A.62 - The NhaD Na^{+}:H^{+} Antiporter (NhaD) Family
- 2.A.68 - The p-Aminobenzoyl-glutamate Transporter (AbgT) Family
- 2.A.94 - The Phosphate Permease (Pho1) Family
- 2.A.101 - The Malonate Uptake (MatC) Family
- 2.A.111 - The Na^{+}/H^{+} Antiporter-E (NhaE) Family
- 2.A.118 - The Basic Amino Acid Antiporter (ArcD) Family

== See also ==
- Ion transporters
- Sodium-Proton antiporter
- Arsenite-Antimonite efflux
- Amino acid transporter
- Solute carrier family
- Transporter Classification Database
- Membrane protein
