= List of diseases (K) =

This is a list of diseases starting with the letter "K".

== Ka ==
=== Kab–Kas ===
- Kabuki syndrome
- Kalam–Hafeez syndrome
- Kaler–Garrity–Stern syndrome
- Kallikrein hypertension
- Kallmann syndrome with spastic paraplegia
- Kallmann syndrome with heart disease
- Kallmann syndrome, type 1, X linked
- Kallmann syndrome, type 3, recessive
- Kalyanraman syndrome
- Kantaputra–Gorlin syndrome
- Kaolin pneumoconiosis
- Kaplan–Plauchu–Fitch syndrome
- Kaplowitz–Bodurtha syndrome
- Kaposi sarcoma
- Kaposiform hemangioendothelioma
- Kapur–Toriello syndrome
- Karandikar–Maria–Kamble syndrome
- Karsch–Neugebauer syndrome
- Kartagener syndrome
- Kashani–Strom–Utley syndrome
- Kasznica–Carlson–Coppedge syndrome

=== Kat–Kaw ===
- Kathisophobia
- Katsantoni–Papadakou–Lagoyanni syndrome
- Katz syndrome
- Kaufman oculocerebrofacial syndrome
- Kawasaki syndrome

== Ke ==
=== Kea–Ken ===
- Kearns–Sayre syndrome
- Keloids
- Kennedy disease
- Kennerknecht–Sorgo–Oberhoffer syndrome
- Kennerknecht–Vogel syndrome
- Kenny–Caffey syndrome
- Kenny–Caffey syndrome, type 1

=== Ker ===
==== Kera ====
- Keratitis, hereditary
- Keratoacanthoma familial
- Keratoacanthoma
- Keratoconjunctivitis sicca
- Keratoconus posticus circumscriptus
- Keratoconus
- Keratoderma hypotrichosis leukonychia
- Keratoderma palmoplantar deafness
- Keratoderma palmoplantar spastic paralysis
- Keratoderma palmoplantaris transgrediens
- Keratolytic winter erythema
- Keratomalacia
- Keratosis focal palmoplantar gingival
- Keratosis follicularis dwarfism cerebral atrophy
- Keratosis follicularis spinulosa decalvans
- Keratosis palmoplantaris adenocarcinoma of the colon
- Keratosis palmoplantaris esophageal colon cancer
- Keratosis palmoplantaris papulosa
- Keratosis palmoplantaris with corneal dystrophy
- Keratosis palmoplantar-periodontopathy
- Keratosis pilaris
- Keratosis, seborrheic

==== Keri–Kern ====
- Kerion celsi
- Kernicterus

=== Keu ===
- Keutel syndrome

== Ki–Kn ==
- Ki-1cell lymphoma
- KID syndrome
- Kidney cancer
- Kidney disease
- Kidney infection
- Kidney stone disease
- Kifafa seizure disorder
- Kikuchi disease
- Kimura disease
- King–Denborough syndrome
- Kjer's optic neuropathy
- Kleeblattschaedel syndrome
- Kleine–Levin syndrome
- Kleiner–Holmes syndrome
- Klinefelter syndrome
- Klippel–Feil syndrome
  - Klippel–Feil deformity conductive deafness absent vagina
  - Klippel–Feil syndrome dominant type
  - Klippel–Feil syndrome recessive type
- Klippel–Trénaunay–Weber syndrome
- Klumpke paralysis
- Klüver–Bucy syndrome
- Kniest dysplasia
- Kniest-like dysplasia lethal
- Knobloch–Layer syndrome
- Knuckle pads, leuconychia and sensorineural deafness

== Ko ==
- Kobberling–Dunnigan syndrome
- Kocher–Debré–Semelaigne syndrome
- Kohler disease
- Kohlschütter-Tönz syndrome
- Koilonychia
- Konigsmark–Knox–Hussels syndrome
- Koone–Rizzo–Elias syndrome
- Korsakoff's syndrome
- Korula–Wilson–Salomonson syndrome
- Kostmann syndrome
- Kosztolanyi syndrome
- Kotzot–Richter syndrome
- Kounis syndrome
- Kousseff–Nichols syndrome
- Kousseff syndrome
- Kowarski syndrome
- Kozlowski–Brown–Hardwick syndrome
- Kozlowski–Celermajer syndrome
- Kozlowski–Massen syndrome
- Kozlowski–Ouvrier syndrome
- Kozlowski–Rafinski–Klicharska syndrome
- Kozlowski–Tsuruta–Taki syndrome
- Kozlowski–Warren–Fisher syndrome
- Kozlowski–Krajewska syndrome

== Kr–Ky ==
- Krabbe leukodystrophy
- Krasnow–Qazi syndrome
- Krause–Kivlin syndrome
- Krauss–Herman–Holmes syndrome
- Krieble–Bixler syndrome
- Kumar–Levick syndrome
- Kurczynski–Casperson syndrome
- Kuru
- Kuskokwim disease
- Kuster–Majewski–Hammerstein syndrome
- Kuster syndrome
- Kuzniecky syndrome
- Kwashiorkor
- Kyasanur forest disease
- Kyphosis
- Kyphosis brachyphalangy optic atrophy
