= ArsB and ArsAB transporters =

Arsenite and Antimonite Efflux Pump

Identifiers
- Symbol: ArsA
- Pfam: PF02374
- InterPro: IPR027541
- SMART: SM00382
- TCDB: 3.A.4
- OPM superfamily: 124
- OPM protein: 3sja
Available protein structures:
- PDB: IF48 IPR027541 PF02374 (ECOD; PDBsum)
- AlphaFold: IPR027541; PF02374

Arsenical pump membrane protein

Identifiers
- Symbol: ArsB
- Pfam: PF02040
- InterPro: IPR000802
- TCDB: 2.A.45
Available protein structures:
- PDB: IPR000802 PF02040 (ECOD; PDBsum)
- AlphaFold: IPR000802; PF02040

Arsenite resistance (Ars) efflux pumps of bacteria may consist of two proteins, ArsB (TC# 2.A.45.1.1; the integral membrane constituent with twelve transmembrane spanners) and ArsA (TC# 3.A.4.1.1; the ATP-hydrolyzing, transport energizing subunit, as for the chromosomally-encoded E. coli system), or of one protein (just the ArsB integral membrane protein of the plasmid-encoded Staphylococcus system). ArsA proteins have two ATP binding domains and probably arose by a tandem gene duplication event. ArsB proteins all possess twelve transmembrane spanners and may also have arisen by a tandem gene duplication event. Structurally, the Ars pumps resemble ABC-type efflux pumps, but there is no significant sequence similarity between the Ars and ABC pumps. When only ArsB is present, the system operates by a pmf-dependent mechanism, and consequently belongs in TC subclass 2.A (i.e.,TC# 2.A.45). When ArsA is also present, ATP hydrolysis drives efflux, and consequently the system belongs in TC subclass 3.A (i.e., TC# 3.A.4). ArsB therefore appears twice in the TC system (ArsB and ArsAB) but ArsA appears only once. These pumps actively expel both arsenite and antimonite.

== Homology ==
Homologues of ArsB are found in Gram-negative and Gram-positive bacteria as well as cyanobacteria. Homologues are also found in archaea and eukarya. Several paralogues may sometimes be found in a single organism. Among the distant homologues found in eukaryotes are members of the DASS family (TC# 2.A.47) including the rat renal Na^{+}:sulfate cotransporter (Q07782) and the human renal Na^{+}:dicarboxylate cotransporter (gbU26209). ArsB proteins are therefore members of a superfamily (called the IT (ion transporter) superfamily). However, ArsB has uniquely gained the ability to function in conjunction with ArsA in order to couple ATP hydrolysis to anion efflux. ArsAB belongs to the ArsA ATPase Superfamily.

Debatably, a unique member of the ArsB family is the rice silicon (silicate) efflux pump, Lsi2 (TC# 2.A.45.2.4). The silicon uptake systems, Lsi1 (TC# 1.A.8.12.2), and Lsi2 are expressed in roots, on the plasma membranes of cells in both the exodermis and the endodermis. In contrast to Lsi1, which is localized on the distal side, Lsi2 is localized on the proximal side of the same cells. Thus these cells have an influx transporter on one side and an efflux transporter on the other side of the cell to permit the effective transcellular transport of the nutrient.

ArsA proteins are homologous to nitrogenase iron (NifH) proteins 2 of bacteria and to protochlorophyllide reductase iron sulfur ATP-binding proteins of cyanobacteria, algae and plants.

== Mechanism ==
ArsA homologues are found in bacteria, archaea and eukarya (both animals and plants), but there are far fewer of them in the databases than ArsB proteins, suggesting that many ArsB homologues function by a pmf-dependent mechanism, probably an arsenite:H^{+} antiport mechanism.

In the E. coli ArsAB transporter, both ArsA and ArsB recognize and bind their anionic substrates. A model has been proposed in which ArsA alternates between two virtually exclusive conformations. In one, (ArsA^{1}) the A1 site is closed but the A2 site is open, but in the other (ArsA^{2}) the opposite is true. Antimonite [Sb(III)] sequesters ArsA in the ArsA^{1} conformation which catalyzes ATP hydrolysis at A2 to drive ArsA between conformations that have high (nucleotide-bound ArsA) and low (nucleotide-free ArsA) affinity for antimonite. It is proposed that ArsA uses this process to sequester Sb(III) and eject it into the ArsB channel.

In the case of ArsAB, at the interface of these two halves are two nucleotide-binding domains and a metalloid-binding domain. Cys-113 and Cys-422 have been shown to form a high-affinity metalloid binding site. The crystal structure of ArsA shows two other bound metalloid atoms, one liganded to Cys-172 and His-453, and the other liganded to His-148 and Ser-420. There is only a single high-affinity metalloid binding site in ArsA. Cys-172 controls the affinity of this site for metalloid and hence the efficiency of metalloactivation of the ArsAB efflux pump.

=== Transport Reaction ===
The overall reaction catalyzed by ArsB (presumably by uniport) is:

Arsenite or Antimonite (in) → Arsenite or Antimonite (out).

The overall reaction catalyzed by ArsB-ArsA is:

Arsenite or Antimonite (in) + ATP ⇌ Arsenite or Antimonite (out) + ADP + P_{i}.

== See also ==
- Arsenic toxicity
- Arsenite
- Antimonite
- Ion transporter
- Ion transporter superfamily
- ARC3 family
- Arsenite-Antimonite efflux
- Arsenite-transporting ATPase
- Solute carrier family
- Active transport
- ATP-binding cassette transporter
- Transporter Classification Database
