= ARC3 family =

The arsenical resistance-3 (ACR3) family (TC# 2.A.59) is a member of the BART superfamily. Based on operon analyses, ARC3 homologues may function either as secondary carriers or as primary active transporters, similarly to the ArsB and ArsAB families. In the latter case ATP hydrolysis again energizes transport. ARC3 homologues transport the same anions as ArsA/AB homologues, though ArsB homologues are members of the IT Superfamily and homologues of the ARC3 family are within the BART Superfamily suggesting they may not be evolutionarily related.

== Structure and Homology ==
Bacillus ARC3 (ArsB; TC# 2.A.59.1.2) probably has a 10 TMS topology. ACR3 of S. cerevisiae is 404 amino acyl residues long and exhibits 10 putative transmembrane α-helical spanners (TMSs). Homologues are found in Mycobacterium tuberculosis (498 aas; gbZ80225), Archaeoglobus fulgidus (370 aas; gbAE001071), Methanobacterium thermoautotrophicum (365 aas; gbAE000865) and Synechocystis (383 aas; spP74311). Thus, members of the ACR3 family are found in bacteria, archaea and eukarya. Sequence similarity of several members of the ACR3 family with members of the bile acid:Na^{+} symporter (BASS) family (TC# 2.A.28) is sufficient to establish homology.

Bioinformatic analyses have revealed that some ACR3 porters are involved in operons together with ArsA-like ATPases, implying that some of these porters may be driven by ATP hydrolysis as primary active transporters. This may occur in addition to or instead of the secondary active transport mechanism established for ACR3 members noted above. Homologous ATPases are found in families TC# 3.A.4, TC# 3.A.19 and TC# 3.A.21 as well as TC# 2.A.59. A region of the ABC ATPase (TC# 3.A.1.26.8; the ribose transporter) shows significant sequence similarity to the ArsA under TC# 3.A.19.1.1 (28% identical; 49% similarity, 0 gaps, e^{−5}) as revealed by TC Blast.

== Function ==
Two proteins of the ACR3 family have been functionally characterized. These proteins are the ACR3 protein of Saccharomyces cerevisiae, also called the ARR3 protein, and the 'ArsB' protein of Bacillus subtilis. While the nomenclature of the ARC3 ArsB protein overlaps with ArsB of E. coli (ArsB family), they are not related. The former yeast protein is present in the plasma membrane and pumps arsenite and antimonite, but not arsenate, tellurite, cadmium or phenylarsine oxide out of the cell in response to the proton motive force (pmf). It uses a proton antiport mechanism to extrude the anions with low affinity. The Bacillus protein exports both arsenite and antimonite. The exact transport mechanism has not established.

The generalized reaction catalyzed by members of the ACR3 family is:

arsenite or antimonite (in) → arsenite or antimonite (out).

== See also ==
- Arsenite-Antimonite efflux
- ArsB and ArsAB transporters
- Bart Superfamily
