= Basic amino acid antiporter family =

Family of transport proteins

The Basic Amino Acid Antiporter (ArcD) family (TC# 2.A.118) is a constituent of the IT superfamily. This family consists of proteins from Gram-negative and Gram-positive bacteria (e.g., Streptococcus, Escherichia, Salmonella, Fusobacterium and Borrelia species). The proteins are of about 480 amino acyl residues (aas) in length and have 10-12 putative transmembrane segments (TMSs). Functionally characterized homologues are in the DcuC (TC #2.A.61) and ArsB (TC #2.A.4) families. Some members of the family probably catalyze arginine/ornithine or citrulline/ornithine antiport.

== See also ==
- Ion transporter superfamily
- Amino acid transporters
- DcuC
- ArsB and ArsAB
- Transporter Classification Database
