= Bart (disambiguation) =

Bart is a masculine given name and a surname, and as an acronym, most frequently refers to Bay Area Rapid Transit.

Bart or BART may also refer to:

== Acronym ==
- Best Available Retrofit Technology, review or rule required under the U.S. Clean Air Act
- Bombardier Advanced Rapid Transit (now INNOVIA Metro), a family of linear induction motor-based Bombardier metro trains
- Basic Aerodynamics Research Tunnel, a wind tunnel facility at the NASA Langley Research Center
- Berkshire Arts & Technology Charter Public School (BArT), located in Adams, Massachusetts
- BART superfamily (Bile/Arsenite/Riboflavin Transporter), a superfamily of transport proteins

== Places ==
- Bart, Doubs, a commune in France
- Bart Township, Pennsylvania, United States

== Other uses ==
- Bart., an abbreviation for the peerage title Baronet
- Bart (magazine), a discontinued Japanese magazine
- Bart, a 2000 album made by Marcus Schmickler and Thomas Lehn on Erstwhile Records
- BART (instrumental), an instrumental track from the eponymous album by the band Ruby
- Typhoon Bart (disambiguation)
- Collège Bart, a private college in Quebec City, Quebec, Canada

=== Fictional characters ===
- Bart, a railroad worker-turned-sheriff and the protagonist of the 1974 film Blazing Saddles
- Rattlesnake Bart, an outlaw employed by M.A.D. and the antagonist of "Gadget Goes West", season 1, episode 24 of Inspector Gadget (1983)
- Bart Simpson, a main character from the television show The Simpsons

== See also ==
- BartPE, an abbreviation of Bart's Preinstalled Environment, a lightweight variant of a Windows operating system
- Bart syndrome, a genetic disorder
- "Barts", a frequently used abbreviation for St Bartholomew's Hospital in the City of London
- Barth (disambiguation), sometimes pronounced "Bart"
