= Pyrophosphatase =

Class of enzymes

Identifiers
- EC no.: 3.6.1.-

Databases
- IntEnz: IntEnz view
- BRENDA: BRENDA entry
- ExPASy: NiceZyme view
- KEGG: KEGG entry
- MetaCyc: metabolic pathway
- PRIAM: profile
- PDB structures: RCSB PDB PDBe PDBsum
- Gene Ontology: AmiGO / QuickGO
Search
- PMC: articles
- PubMed: articles
- NCBI: proteins

Pyrophosphatases, also known as diphosphatases, are acid anhydride hydrolases that act upon diphosphate bonds.

Examples include:

- Inorganic pyrophosphatase, which acts upon the free pyrophosphate ion
- Tobacco acid pyrophosphatase, which catalyses the hydrolysis of a phosphoric ester
- Various organic pyrophosphatases, which act upon organic molecules with the pyrophosphate group (but excluding triphosphatases that act on the final bond):
  - Thiamine pyrophosphatase

== See also ==
- List of EC numbers (EC 3) § 3.6.1: In phosphorus-containing anhydrides
