= Phosphate permease =

Phosphate permeases are membrane transport proteins that facilitate the diffusion of phosphate into and out of a cell or organelle. Some of these families include:

- TC# 2.A.1.4 - Organophosphate:P_{i} Antiporter (OPA) Family, (i.e., Pho-84 of Neurospora crassa; TC# 2.A.1.9.2)
- TC# 2.A.20 - Inorganic Phosphate Transporter (PiT) Family
- TC# 2.A.47.2 - Phosphate porters of the Divalent Anion:Na^{+} Symporter (DASS) Family, includes Pho87/90/91
- TC# 2.A.58 - Phosphate:Na^{+} Symporter (PNaS) Family
- TC# 2.A.94 - Phosphate Permease (Pho1) Family

== See also ==
- Major facilitator superfamily
- Ion transporter superfamily
- Phosphotransferase
- Inorganic phosphate
- permeases
- Transporter Classification Database

== See also ==
- TC# 3.A.10 - H^{+}, Na^{+}-translocating Pyrophosphatase (M^{+}-PPase) Family
- TC# 4.E.1 - Vacuolar (Acidocalcisome) Polyphosphate Polymerase (V-PPP) Family
