= Indy (gene) =

Gene found in fruit flies

I'm not dead yet

Identifiers
- Organism: Drosophila melanogaster
- Symbol: Indy
- PDB: 8ZKZ
- UniProt: Q9VVT2
Search for
- Structures: Swiss-model
- Domains: InterPro

I'm not dead yet 2

Identifiers
- Organism: Drosophila melanogaster
- Symbol: Indy-2
- UniProt: Q9VDQ0
Search for
- Structures: Swiss-model
- Domains: InterPro

Indy, short for I'm not dead yet, is a gene found in the fruit fly Drosophila melanogaster, an important model organism. Mutant versions of this gene have doubled the average life span of fruit flies in at least one set of experiments, but this result has been subject to controversy. Both Indy proteins belong to the sodium sulfate symporter Pfam family. Its name originates from a well-known comic line in Monty Python and the Holy Grail.

Reduced expression of this gene in Drosophila melanogaster flies and C. elegans worms (P32739) modeled the effects on obesity and diabetes of caloric reduction in primates such as humans. A similar effect was seen with SLC13A5 (mIndy) knockouts of mice.

== See also ==
- Cell biology
