= MatC family =

Constituent of the ion transporter (IT) superfamily

The Malonate Uptake (MatC) family (TC# 2.A.101) is a constituent of the ion transporter (IT) superfamily. It consists of proteins from Gram-negative and Gram-positive bacteria (e.g., Xanthomonas, Rhizobium and Streptomyces species), simple eukaryotes (e.g., Chlamydomonas reinhardtii) and archaea (e.g., Methanococcus jannaschii). The proteins are of about 450 amino acyl residues in length with 12-14 putative transmembrane segments (TMSs). Closest functionally-characterized homologues are in the DASS (TC #2.A.47) family. One member of this family is a putative malonate transporter (MatC of Rhizobium leguminosarum bv trifolii, TC# 2.A.101.1.2).

== See also ==
- "fkbF - FkbF - Streptomyces hygroscopicus subsp. ascomyceticus - fkbF gene & protein".www.uniprot.org. Retrieved 2016-03-03.
- "matC - Malonate carrier protein - Rhizobium leguminosarum - matC gene & protein". www.uniprot.org. Retrieved 2016-03-03.
