= H+, Na+-translocating pyrophosphatase family =

H+, Na+-translocating pyrophosphatase

Identifiers
- Symbol: ?
- Pfam: PF03030
- InterPro: IPR004131
- TCDB: 3.A.10
- OPM superfamily: 390
- OPM protein: 4av3
Available protein structures:
- PDB: IPR004131 PF03030 (ECOD; PDBsum)
- AlphaFold: IPR004131; PF03030

Members of the H^{+}, Na^{+}-translocating Pyrophosphatase (M^{+}-PPase) Family (TC# 3.A.10) are found in the vacuolar (tonoplast) membranes of higher plants, algae, and protozoa, and in both bacteria and archaea. They are therefore ancient enzymes.

Two types of inorganic diphosphatase, very different in terms of both amino acid sequence and structure, have been characterised to date: soluble and transmembrane proton-pumping pyrophosphatases (sPPases and H(^{+})-PPases, respectively). sPPases are ubiquitous proteins that hydrolyse pyrophosphate to release heat, whereas H^{+}-PPases, so far unidentified in animal and fungal cells, couple the energy of PPi hydrolysis to proton movement across biological membranes. The latter type is represented by this group of proteins. H^{+}-PPases vacuolar-type inorganic pyrophosphatases (V-PPase) or pyrophosphate-energised vacuolar membrane proton pumps. In plants, vacuoles contain two enzymes for acidifying the interior of the vacuole, the V-ATPase and the V-PPase (V is for vacuolar).

Two distinct biochemical subclasses of H^{+}-PPases have been characterised to date: K^{+}-stimulated and K^{+}-insensitive.

== Classification ==
Full-length members of the H^{+}-PPase family have been sequenced from numerous bacteria, archaea and eukaryotes. These H^{+} pumping enzymes, which are probably homodimeric, have been reported to fall into two phylogenetic subfamilies. One subfamily invariably contains a conserved cysteine (Cys^{222}) and includes all known K^{+}-independent H^{+}-PPases, while the other has another conserved cysteine (Cys^{573}) but lacks Cys^{222} and includes all known K^{+}-dependent H^{+}-PPases. All H^{+}-PPases require Mg^{2+}, and those from plant vacuoles, acidocalcisomes of protozoa and fermentative bacteria require mM K^{+}. Those from respiratory and photosynthetic bacteria as well as archaea are less dependent upon K^{+}. However, exceptions may exist. It is not sure whether K^{+} is transported.

The archaeon, Methanosarcina mazei Gö1, encodes within its genome two H^{+}-translocating pyrophosphatases (PPases), Mvp1 and Mvp2. Mvp1 resembles bacterial PPases while Mvp2 resembles plant PPases. Mvp2 was shown to translocate 1 H^{+} per pyrophosphate hydrolyzed.

Some PPases from Anaerostipes caccae, Chlorobium limicola, Clostridium tetani, and Desulfuromonas acetoxidans have been identified as K^{+}-dependent Na^{+} transporters. Phylogenetic analysis led to the identification of a monophyletic clade comprising characterized and predicted Na^{+}-transporting PPases (Na^{+}-PPases) within the K^{+}-dependent subfamily. H^{+}-transporting PPases (H^{+}-PPases) are more heterogeneous and form at least three independent clades in both subfamilies.

== Function ==
The plant enzymes probably pump one H^{+} upon hydrolysis of pyrophosphate, thereby generating a proton motive force, positive and acidic in the tonoplast lumen. They establish a pmf of similar magnitude to that generated by the H^{+}-translocating ATPases in the same vacuolar membrane. The bacterial and archaeal proteins may catalyze fully reversible reactions, thus being able to synthesize pyrophosphate when the pmf is sufficient. The enzyme from R. rubrum contributes to the pmf when light intensity is insufficient to generate a pmf sufficient in magnitude to support rapid ATP synthesis. Both C-termini of the dimeric subunits of V-PPase are on the same side of the membrane, and they are close to each other. Transmembrane domain 6 of vacuolar H^{+}-pyrophosphatase appears to mediate both protein targeting and proton transport.

The generalized transport reaction catalyzed by H^{+}-PPases is:

pyrophosphate (P_{2}) + H_{2}O + H^{+} (cytoplasm) → inorganic phosphate (2 P_{i}) + H^{+} (external milieu or vacuolar lumen).

== Structure ==
Eukaryotic members of the H^{+}-PPase family are large proteins of about 770 amino acyl residues (aas) with 15 or 16 putative transmembrane α-helical spanners (TMSs). The N-termini are predicted to be in the vacuolar lumen while the C-termini are thought to be in the cytoplasm. These proteins exhibit a region that shows convincing sequence similarity to the regions surrounding the DCCD-sensitive glutamate in the C-terminal regions of the c-subunits of F-type ATPases (TC #3.A.2). The H^{+}-pyrophosphatase of Streptomyces coelicolor has been shown to have a 17 TMS topology with the substrate binding domain exposed to the cytoplasm. The C-terminus is hydrophilic with a single C-terminal TMS. The basic structure is believed to have 16 TMSs with several large cytoplasmic loops containing functional motifs. Several acidic residues in the Arabidopsis H^{+}-PPase have been shown to be important for function. Some plants possess closely related H^{+}-PPase isoforms. These enzymes have the enzyme commission number EC 3.6.1.1.

Lin et al. (2012) reported the crystal structure of a Vigna radiata H^{+}-PPase (VrH^{+}-PPase) in complex with a non-hydrolysable substrate analogue, imidodiphosphate (IDP), at 2.35 Å resolution. Each VrH^{+}-PPase subunit consists of an integral membrane domain formed by 16 transmembrane helices. IDP is bound in the cytosolic region of each subunit and trapped by numerous charged residues and five Mg^{2+} ions. A previously undescribed proton translocation pathway is formed by six core transmembrane helices. Proton pumping can be initialized by PP(i) hydrolysis, and H^{+} is then transported into the vacuolar lumen through a pathway consisting of Arg 242, Asp 294, Lys 742 and Glu 301. Lin et al. (2012) proposed a working model of the mechanism for the coupling between proton pumping and PP(i) hydrolysis by H^{+}-PPases. Membrane-integral pyrophosphatases (M-PPases) are crucial for the survival of plants, bacteria, and protozoan parasites. They couple pyrophosphate hydrolysis or synthesis to Na^{+} or H^{+} pumping. The 2.6Å structure of Thermotoga maritima H^{+}-PPase in the resting state revealed a previously unknown solution for ion pumping. The hydrolytic center, 20 angstroms above the membrane, is coupled to the gate formed by the conserved Asp(243), Glu(246), and Lys(707) by an unusual 'coupling funnel' of six α helices. Helix 12 slides down upon substrate binding to open the gate by a simple binding-change mechanism. Below the gate, four helices form the exit channel. Superimposing helices 3 to 6, 9 to 12, and 13 to 16 suggests that M-PPases arose through gene triplication. By comparing the active sites, fluoride inhibition data and the various models for ion transport, Kajander et al. concluded that membrane-integral PPases probably use binding of pyrophosphate to drive pumping.

== See also ==
- Phosphate permease
- Pyrophosphatase
