= Kohlschütter–Tönz syndrome =

- Other names: Epilepsy-dementia-amelogenesis imperfecta syndrome
- Kohlschütter–Tönz syndrome is inherited via an autosomal recessive manner.
- Specialty: Neurology

Kohlschütter–Tönz syndrome (KTS), also called amelo-cerebro-hypohidrotic syndrome, is a rare inherited syndrome characterized by epilepsy, psychomotor delay or regression, intellectual disability, and yellow teeth caused by amelogenesis imperfecta (abnormal formation of tooth enamel). It is a type A ectodermal dysplasia.

It is autosomal recessive and symptoms appear in early childhood. The syndrome was first described in 1974 by Alfried Kohlschütter and colleagues. Only 24 affected individuals were known as of 2012. The disease has not been connected to any other known epileptic syndromes. Some but not all cases are associated with mutations in a gene called ROGDI. Another gene that has been associated with this condition is the SLC13A5 gene: see SLC13A5 citrate transporter disorder. Diagnoses of this syndrome have occurred in Switzerland, Sicily, the Northern Israel Druze community as well as some other parts of Western Europe.

== Symptoms and signs ==
The only symptoms seen consistently in all 24 diagnosed cases are epilepsy, amelogenesis imperfecta in both primary and secondary teeth, and developmental delay. All symptoms experienced are experienced in varying degrees across each case.

There are some physical symptoms that have been associated with KTS. The most prominent symptom is amelogenesis imperfecta which gives the teeth a stained brown-yellow color. The enamel is thin, rough, and prone to crumbling. Two types of amelogenesis imperfecta (AI) have been seen in KTS patients. The first is Hypoplastic which is caused by the enamel being underdeveloped, and the second is hypo-calcified which causes the enamel to be soft and chalky. AI originated as a heterogeneous syndrome but has been observed as homogeneous in the case of KTS. Other physical symptoms that some cases have presented with include broad thumbs and toes, microcephaly, coarse hair, mildly asymmetric skull, up slanting palpebral fissures which is where the outside corners of the eyes are higher than normal, and smooth philtrum which is where the upper lip does not have a dip in the center.

KTS also presents itself with symptoms that affect the patient's ability to function. To varying degrees, patients either do not develop or have under developed language skills as well as under developed ambulance which is the ability to move around. Patients also present with global developmental delays The severity of these symptoms is correlated with the intensity, frequency, and age of onset of the patient's epilepsy as well as their responsiveness to treatment for the epileptic attacks. In some severe cases, patients develop spastic tetraplegia which is the loss of function in all four limbs.

The extreme variability of symptoms was well represented in one family with five affected children. The first child was in a vegetative state and died at age 2. The second child showed psychomotor developmental delay at 1 month old, and epilepsy unresponsive to treatment at 9 months old. This child was also nonverbal and non ambulant. The third child's epilepsy was responsive to treatment and was ambulant, but she had an intellectual disability and only slight verbal abilities. The fourth child demonstrated developmental delay at age 6 months and had epileptic attacks that were only partially responsive to treatment. This child was non verbal and awkwardly ambulant. The fifth child was ambulant, but nonverbal and had epilepsy that was partially responsive to treatment. This variation has been seen across other cases of KTS as well.

Symptoms of KTS, including epilepsy, amelogenesis imperfecta and developmental delay, overlap with the phenotype described for den Hoed-de Boer-Voisin syndrome (DHDBV), an autosomal dominant condition caused by heterozygous missense variants in SATB1.

== Genetics ==
The pedigrees of KTS patients suggest autosomal recessive inheritance. Although several mutations in the ROGDI gene have been linked to the cause of KTS, the connection between the enamel defect and the altered brain function of patients has not yet been found.

=== ROGDI ===
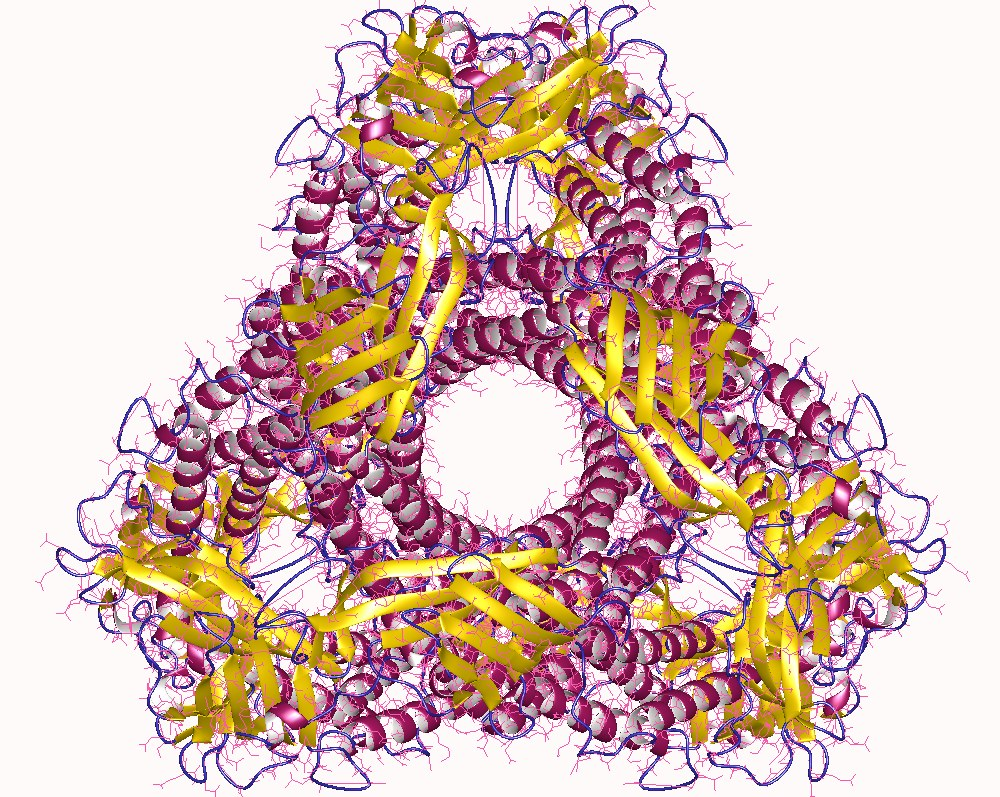
Rogdi protein homo12mer, Human

The ROGDI gene is located on chromosome 16 and contains 11 exons. The ROGDI protein contains 287 amino acids and has a leucine zipper form. The function of this protein is not currently known. Expression studies have shown that the gene has high expression in the hippocampus. It is also highly expressed in other parts of the adult brain, spinal cord, peripheral blood, heart, and bone marrow. These studies showed a low level of expression in the fetal brain which is consistent with the onset of symptoms occurring no earlier than one month after birth. Protein staining has provided evidence supporting that the ROGDI protein may be a part of the nuclear envelope. Studies also suggest that ROGDI may interact with DISC1 which is involved in neuronal proliferation and migration and differentiation of cortical interneurons.

All ROGDI mutations which include frameshift, nonsense, and splice site mutations cause premature mRNA degradation or protein structure alteration that results in the lack of function of the protein.

==== Frameshift mutations ====
One family had a frameshift mutation called c.366dupA. This duplication that caused the frameshift resulted in a premature stop codon in the ROGDI gene after the 19th amino acid.

==== Nonsense mutation ====
A mutation called c.507delC which is the deletion of a cytosine at position 507 resulted in a nonsense mutation. A nonsense mutation is a point mutation that results in a premature stop codon. Five affected families contained the nonsense mutation called c.268C>T where a thymine is in the place of a cytosine at position 268 on exon 5.

==== Splice-site mutation ====
There are three different splice-site mutations that have been identified in KTS patients. One is known as c.45+9_45+20del and prevents the recognition of the splice site at intron 1. This results in a frameshift in the gene causing a premature stop codon in exon 3. Another is known as c.531+5G>C. This mutation destroys the splice acceptor and donor sites resulting in an in-frame deletion. The protein resulting from this gene has a highly altered structure and is not functional. The last is known as c.532=2A>T and occurs in intron 7. This also destroys the splice donor and acceptor sites due to the inclusion of 83 extra nucleotides before exon 8 in the mRNA. This mutation causes non-sense mediated decay of the mRNA.

=== Related gene mutations ===
Due to the fact that not all 10 affected families were found to have a mutation in ROGDI, and the noted variability between affected individuals, it is possible this syndrome is a contiguous gene syndrome. A contiguous gene syndrome occurs when multiple genes are affected by an alteration in a short chromosomal region.

Amelogenesis Imperfecta is known to be caused by other genetic mutations. Two examples are in chromosome 4 open reading frame 26 (C4orf26) and in the SLC24A4 which both segregate in an autosomal recessive manner.

== Diagnosis ==
Diagnosis occurs based on the two most common features of this syndrome: epilepsy and symmetrical enamel hypoplasia also known as amelogenesis imperfecta. Because the tooth discoloration caused by amelogenesis imperfecta is often thought to be caused by environmental factors or other diseases, diagnosis of this syndrome is sometimes overlooked. The onset of symptoms can occur when the patient is between one month and four years old, contributing to the misconception that tooth discoloration is due to the environment.

=== Brain imaging ===
Consistent abnormalities in brain imaging across all cases have not yet been discovered, but individual cases do show altered brain activity.

==== Magnetic resonance imaging ====
Magnetic resonance imaging (MRI) in one family showed mild atrophy of the cranial vermis as well as a small pons. Different types of atrophy including cerebellar in four individuals and basal ganglia have been evident through MRIs.

==== Electroencephalography ====
Electroencephalography (EEG) in one patient showed epileptiformic activities in the frontal and frontotemporal areas as well as increased spike waves while the patient was sleeping. Another patient's EEG showed occipital rhythms in background activity that was abnormal, focal discharges over the temporal lobe, and multifocial epileptiform activity. Several patients showed a loss of normal background activity.

== Treatments ==
Most patients with KTS have epilepsy that is resistant to anti-epileptic agents. Some patients showed a partial response to treatment, but very few were able to stop their epilepsy through treatment. One case was responsive to treatment using phenobartbital and vigabatrin which are both anti-epileptic agents. Spasticity can be treated with baclofen, but not all patients are responsive to the treatment.

== History ==
In 1974, Dr. Tönz brought an infant with a fatal brain disease to the attention of Alfried Kohlschütter. The infant's symptoms included loss of motor skills, mental disability, epilepsy, and missing enamel. The infant also showed signs of myelin breakdown and did not produce the same amount of sweat as a normal person which resulted in the development of the term amelo-cerebro-hypohydrotic syndrome. A connection between the neurological and enamel symptoms is unknown.
