= Sodium:dicarboxylate symporter =

Protein family

SDF
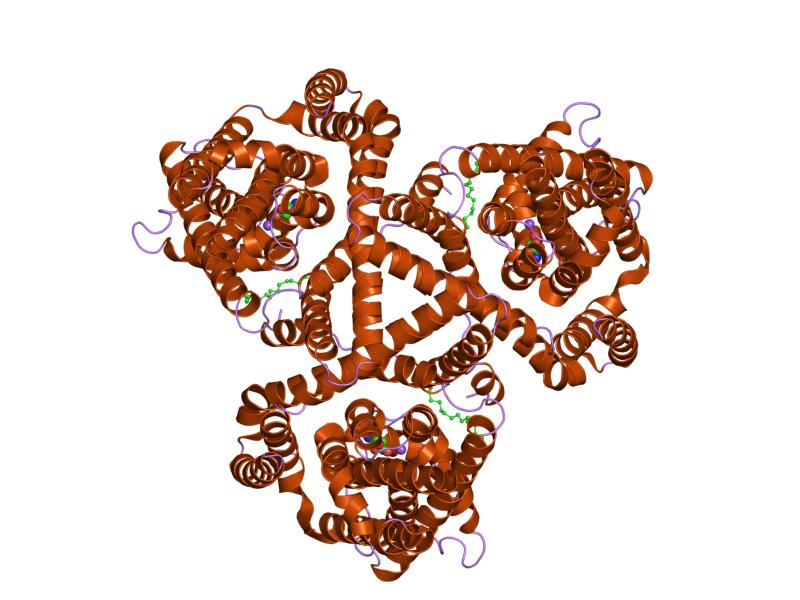
- crystal structure of gltph in complex with l-aspartate and sodium ions

Identifiers
- Symbol: SDF
- Pfam: PF00375
- InterPro: IPR001991
- PROSITE: PDOC00591
- TCDB: 2.A.23
- OPM superfamily: 20
- OPM protein: 2nwl
Available protein structures:
- Pfam: structures / ECOD
- PDB: RCSB PDB; PDBe; PDBj
- PDBsum: structure summary

It has been shown that integral membrane proteins that mediate the uptake of a wide variety of molecules with the concomitant uptake of sodium ions (sodium symporters) can be grouped, on the basis of sequence and functional similarities into a number of distinct families. One of these families is known as the sodium:dicarboxylate symporter family (SDF) (it is different from divalent anion–sodium symporter).

Such re-uptake of neurotransmitters from the synapses, is thought to be an important mechanism for terminating their action, by removing these chemicals from the synaptic cleft, and transporting them into presynaptic nerve terminals, and surrounding neuroglia. this removal is also believed to prevent them accumulating to the point of reaching neurotoxic.

The structure of these transporter proteins has been variously reported to contain from 8 to 10 transmembrane (TM) regions, although 10 now seems to be the accepted value.

Members of the family include: several mammalian excitatory amino acid transporters, and a number of bacterial transporters. They vary with regards to their dependence on transport of sodium, and other ions.
