= CitMHS family =

Family of transport proteins

The Citrate-Mg^{2+}:H^{+} (CitM) / Citrate-Ca^{2+}:H^{+} (CitH) Symporter (CitMHS) Family (TC# 2.A.11) is a family of transport proteins belonging to the Ion transporter superfamily. Members of this family are found in Gram-positive and Gram-negative bacteria, archaea and possibly eukaryotes. These proteins all probably arose by an internal gene duplication event. Lensbouer & Doyle (2010) have reviewed these systems, classifying the porters with three superfamilies, according to ion-preference:

1) Mg^{2+}-preferring,

2) Ca^{2+}-preferring, and

3) Fe^{2+}-preferring.

A representative list of proteins belonging to the CitMHS family can be found in the Transporter Classification Database.

== CitM and CitH ==
Two of the characterized members of the CitMHS family, both citrate uptake permeases from Bacillus subtilis, are CitM (TC# 2.A.11.1.1) and CitH (TC# 2.A.11.1.2).

=== Function ===
CitM is believed to transport a citrate^{2−}-Mg^{2+}complex in symport with one H^{+} per Mg^{2+}-citrate while CitH apparently transports a citrate^{2−}-Ca^{2+} complex in symport with protons. The cation specificity of CitM is: Mg^{2+}, Mn^{2+}, Ba^{2+}, Ni^{2+}, Co^{2+}, Ca^{2+} and Zn^{2+}, in this preferential order. CitM is highly specific for citrate and D-isocitrate and does not transport other di- and tri-carboxylates including succinate, L-isocitrate, cis-aconitate and tricarballylate. For CitH, the cation specificity (in order of preference) is: Ca^{2+}, Ba^{2+} and Sr^{2+}. The two proteins are 60% identical, contain about 400 amino acyl residues and possess twelve putative transmembrane spanners. A CitM homologue in S. mutans transports citrate conjugated to Fe^{2+} or Mn^{2+} but not Ca^{2+}, Mg^{2+} or Ni^{2+}.

The transport reactions catalyzed by (1) CitM and (2) CitH, respectively, are:

(1) Citrate • Mg (out) + nH^{+} (out) ⇌ Citrate • Mg (in) + nH^{+} (in)

(2) Citrate (out) + nH^{+} (out) ⇌ Citrate (in) + nH^{+} (in)

(3) Citrate • Ca^{2+} (out) + nH^{+} (out) ⇌ Citrate • Ca^{2+} (in) + nH^{+} (in)

== See also ==
- Membrane transport protein
- Carrier protein
- Calcium in biology
- Transporter Classification Database
