= Arsenite-antimonite transporter =

Arsenite-antimonite transporters are membrane transporters that pump arsenite or antimonite out of a cell. Antimonite is the salt of antimony (Sb(III)) and has been found to significantly impact the toxicity of arsenite. The similar structure of As(III) and Sb(III) makes it plausible that certain transporters function in the efflux of both substrates. Arsenic efflux transporters exist in almost every organism and serve to remove this toxic compound from the cell.

== Subfamilies ==
As of early 2016, there are at least three known families of proteins known to participate in arsenite and antimonite efflux.

- ArsB family (TC# 2.A.45)
- ArsAB Family (TC# 3.A.4)
- Arsenical resistance-3 (ARC3) family (TC#2.A.59)

The membrane transporter ArsB can function as a secondary carrier or as a primary active transporter, in which case ArsA, an ATPase, must be superimposed onto ArsB. Arsenite and antimonite can also be pumped out of the cell by members of the ARC3 family, a member of the BART superfamily, which can participate in both secondary transport or primary active transport. Based on operon analyses, Arc3 homologues may similarly function either as secondary carriers or as primary active transporters. In the latter case ATP hydrolysis again energizes transport.

== See also ==
- Arsenic toxicity
- Arsenite-transporting ATPase
- Solute carrier family
- Active transport
- ATP-binding cassette transporter
