= Pho1 family =

The Pho1 phosphate permease family (TC# 2.A.94) is a family of phosphate transporters belonging to the ion transporter (IT) superfamily. Representative members of the Pho1 family include the putative phosphate transporter PHO1 of Arabidopsis thaliana (TC# 2.A.94.1.1), and the xenotropic and polytropic murine-leukemia virus receptor Xpr1 of Metazoa, such as Homo sapiens, Drosophila, and Culex pipiens (TC# 2.A.94.1.2).

== Pho1 ==
Pho1 of A. thaliana is a member of the PHO1 family (11 paralogues in A. thaliana). This protein is 782 amino acyl residues in length and possesses 7 transmembrane segments (TMSs). It functions in inorganic phosphate transport and homeostasis. Pho1 catalyzes efflux of phosphate from epidermal and cortical cells into the xylem. The SPX superfamily domain is an N-terminal soluble domain. These proteins belong to the EXS (Erd1/Xpr1/Syg1) superfamily.

The generalized reaction catalyzed by Pho1 is:

P_{i} (cells) → P_{i} (xylem)

== See also ==
- Phosphate permease
- Ion transporter superfamily
- Inorganic phosphate
- Transporter Classification Database
