= Divalent anion–sodium symporter =

Identifiers
- Symbol: DASS
- Pfam: PF00939
- TCDB: 2.A.47
- OPM superfamily: 272
- OPM protein: 4f35
Available protein structures:
- PDB: PF00939 (ECOD; PDBsum)
- AlphaFold: PF00939

Divalent anion:Na^{+} symporters were found in bacteria, archaea, plant chloroplasts and animals.

== Structure ==
They vary in size from 432 amino acyl residues (M. jannaschii) to 923 residues (Saccharomyces cerevisiae). The three S. cerevisiae proteins are large (881-923 residues); the animal proteins are substantially smaller (539-616 residues), and the bacterial proteins are still smaller (461-612 residues). They exhibit 11-14 putative transmembrane α-helical spanners (TMSs). An 11 TMS model for the animal NaDC-1 and hNaSi-1 carriers has been proposed. Two serine residues in the human sulfate transporter, hNaSi-1 (TC# 2.A.47.1.16; Q9BZW2), one in TMS 5 and one in TMS 6, are required for sulfate transport. The former carrier and the other NaDC isoforms cotransport 3 Na^{+} with each dicarboxylate. Protonated tricarboxylates are also cotransported with 3 Na^{+}. Several organisms possess multiple paralogues of the DASS family (e.g., 4 for E. coli; 2 for H. influenzae, 3 for S. cerevisiae, and at least 4 for C. elegans).

== Homology ==
Proteins of the DASS family are divided into two groups of transporters with distinct anion specificities: the Na^{+}-sulfate (NaS) cotransporters and the Na^{+}-carboxylate (NaC) cotransporters. Mammalian members of this family are: SLC13A1 (NaS1), SLC13A2 (NaC1), SLC13A3 (NaC3), SLC13A4 (NaS2) and SLC13A5 (NaC2). DASS family proteins encode plasma membrane polypeptides with 8-13 putative transmembrane domains, and are expressed in a variety of tissues. They are all Na^{+}-coupled symporters. The Na^{+}:anion coupling ratio is 3:1, indicative of electrogenic properties. They have a substrate preference for divalent anions, which include tetra-oxyanions for the NaS cotransporters or Krebs cycle intermediates (including mono-, di- and tricarboxylates) for the NaC cotransporters. The molecular and cellular mechanisms underlying the biochemical, physiological and structural properties of DASS family members have been reviewed.

The phylogenetic tree for the DASS family reveals six clusters as follows:

1. all animal homologues;
2. all yeast proteins;
3. a functionally uncharacterized protein from Ralstonia eutrophus;
4. three E. coli proteins plus one from H. influenzae and one from spinach chloroplasts (the SodiT1 oxoglutarate:malate translocator);
5. an E. coli Orf that clusters loosely with a sulfur deprivation regulated protein of Synechocystis, and
6. an M. jannaschii protein that clusters loosely with an H. influenzae Orf.

Distant homologues of DASS family proteins may include members of the Ars (arsenite exporter) (TC# 3.A.4) family as well as the NhaB (TC #2.A.34) and NhaC (TC #2.A.35) Na^{+}/H^{+} antiporter families. The DASS family is therefore a member of the ion transporter (IT) superfamily.

== Function ==
Functionally characterized proteins of the DASS family (also called the SLC13 family) transport:

1. organic di- and tricarboxylates of the Krebs Cycle as well as dicarboxylate amino acid,
2. inorganic sulfate and (3) phosphate.

The generalized transport reaction catalyzed by the DASS family proteins is probably:

Anion^{2−} (out) + nM^{+} [Na^{+} or H^{+}] (out) → Anion^{2−} (in) + nM^{+} (in).

== See also ==
- Solute carrier family
- Ion transporters
- Transport protein
- Membrane transport protein
- Transporter Classification Database
