= Kowarski syndrome =

- Other names: Short stature due to growth hormone qualitative anomaly
- This condition is inherited in an autosomal recessive manner.
- Frequency: 0.0001%

Kowarski syndrome describes cases of growth failure (height and bone age two standard deviations below the mean for age), despite the presence of normal or slightly high blood growth hormone by radioimmunoassay (RIA-GH) and low serum IGF1 (formerly called somatomedin), and who exhibit a significant increase in growth rate following recombinant GH therapy.

== Cause ==
Allen Avinoam Kowarski et al. described the first two cases of the Kowarski syndrome in 1978. The group speculated that their patients' growth impairment was caused by a mutation in the growth hormone gene, which altered the structure of their secreted growth hormone, reducing its biological activity while retaining its ability to bind the antibodies used in the RIA-GH. Their RIA-GH measured growth hormone of reduced bioactivity. The children retained the ability to respond to treatment with active growth hormone.

The speculation of Kowarski et al. was confirmed by Valenta et al. in 1985, Takahshi et al. in 1996 and 1997 and Besson et al. in 2005. Valenta et al. studied a case of Kowarski syndrome where they confirmed a structural abnormality of the growth hormone molecule. 60 to 90% of circulating growth hormone of the patient was in the form of tetramers and dimers (normal, 14% to 39% in plasma) and the patients' growth hormone polymers were abnormally resistant to conversion into monomers by urea.

Takahashi et al. reported a case of a boy with short stature who was heterozygous for a mutation in the GH1 gene. In this child, growth hormone not only could not activate the GH receptor (GHR) but also inhibited the action of wild type GH because of its greater affinity for GHR and GH-binding protein (GHBP) that is derived from the extracellular domain of the GHR. Thus, a dominant-negative effect was observed.

Takahashi et al. demonstrated in a girl with short stature, a biologically inactive growth hormone resulting from a heterozygous mutation in the GH1 gene. At age 3 years, the girl's height was 3.6 standard deviations below the mean for age and sex. Bone age was delayed by 1.5 years. She had a prominent forehead and a hypoplastic nasal bridge with normal body proportions. She showed lack of growth hormone action despite high immunoassayable GH levels in serum and marked catch-up growth to exogenous GH administration. Results of other studies were compatible with the production of a bioinactive GH, which prevented dimerization of the growth hormone receptor, a crucial step in GH signal transduction.

Besson et al. described in 1955 a Serbian patient with Kowarski syndrome who was homozygous for a mutation in the GH1 gene that disrupted the first disulfide bridge in growth hormone. The parents were each heterozygous for the mutation and were of normal stature.

== Diagnosis ==
=== Diagnostic criteria ===
The discovery of the Kowarski syndrome created a dilemma. The first diagnostic test for the syndrome was subjecting the suspected children to six month of growth hormone therapy. Kowarski syndrome was assumed to be a very rare disorder (officially recognized as an "orphan disease"). Researchers could not justify subjecting children to a trial period of growth hormone therapy to confirm the diagnosis of a rare syndrome. There is a need for a reliable and practical diagnostic procedure for the syndrome.

=== Reliability of testing ===
The standard test for growth hormone deficiency is the growth hormone stimulation test. Peak levels of growth hormone below normal are considered confirmation of a growth hormone deficiency. Growth-impaired children with a normal stimulation test were considered suspect for having the Kowarski syndrome that may benefit from treatment with growth hormone.

Zadik et al. reported in 1990 that the growth hormone stimulation test is not reliable, suggesting the use of the more reliable 24-hour integrated concentration of growth hormone (IC-GH) as a better test. In 1995, it was also suggested that some cases of the neurosecretory growth failure syndrome might have the Kowarski syndrome.

Kerstin Albertsson Wikland confirmed in 1992 that the IC-GH test is a reproducible test for growth hormone deficiency and Carel et al. confirmed in 1997 that the reliability of the growth hormone stimulation tests was poor.

A 1987 study by Bistrizer et al. suggested a diagnostic procedure that may be used to diagnose the Kowarski syndrome. Their study was based on the requirement for the growth hormone molecule to bind a specific binding molecule on the wall of the responsive cells to elicit its activity. Their study demonstrated a decreased ability of the growth hormone from children with the Kowarski syndrome to bind with living IM-9 cells. The test involved measuring the ratio between the levels of growth hormone by a radioreceptor assay (RRA-GH) to the level of growth hormone determined by the established radioimmunoassay (RIA-GH). The study found that the RRA-GH/RIA-GH ratio in NS subjects was normal but significantly below normal (P<0.005) in the Kowarski syndrome patients. The authors proposed the use of their test for the diagnosis of the Kowarski syndrome.

Bistrizer, Chalew and Kowarski demonstrated in 1995 that a modified RRA-GH/RIA-GH ratio test was a predictor for the responsiveness of growth-impaired children to growth hormone therapy.

The RRA-GH/RIA-GH ratio assay proposed by Bistrizer et al. can be used for screening of patients who may have the Kowarski syndrome thus more likely to respond to Growth Hormone therapy. Advances in the methodology for identifying spot mutations in the DNA of individuals demonstrated that the "Kowarski Syndrome is caused by various mutations in the GH1 gene (17q22-q24) that result in structural GH anomalies and a biologically inactive molecule." Testing individual patient for such mutation is offered on the Internet.
