= P-Aminobenzoyl-glutamate transporter =

Family of transport proteins

Identifiers
- Symbol: AbgT
- Pfam: PF03806
- TCDB: 2.A.68
- OPM superfamily: 272
- OPM protein: 4r1i
Available protein structures:
- PDB: PF03806 (ECOD; PDBsum)
- AlphaFold: PF03806

The p-aminobenzoyl-glutamate transporter (AbgT) family (TC# 2.A.68) is a family of transporter proteins belonging to the ion transporter (IT) superfamily. The AbgT family consists of the AbgT (YdaH; TC# 2.A.68.1.1) protein of E. coli and the MtrF drug exporter (TC# 2.A.68.1.2) of Neisseria gonorrhoeae. The former protein is apparently cryptic in wild-type cells, but when expressed on a high copy number plasmid, or when expressed at higher levels due to mutation, it appeared to allow uptake (K_{m} = 123 nM; see Michaelis–Menten kinetics) and subsequent utilization of p-aminobenzoyl-glutamate as a source of p-aminobenzoate for p-aminobenzoate auxotrophs. p-Aminobenzoate is a constituent of and a precursor for the biosynthesis of folic acid. MtrF was annotated as a putative drug efflux pump.

== Structure ==
AbgT is 510 amino acyl residues long and has 12-13 putative transmembrane α-helical spanners (TMSs). MtrF is 522 aas long and has 11 or 12 putative TMSs. The 3-d structures of MtrF and a YdaH homologue have been solved, and functional studies show that it is a drug exporter. The 3-d structure shows that it has 9 TMSs with hairpin entry loops.

Crystal Structures:

== Genetics ==
The abgT gene is preceded by two genes, abgA and abgB, which code for homologous amino acyl amino hydrolases and hydrolyze p-aminobenzoyl glutamate to p-aminobenzoate and glutamate. Because of the structural similarity of p-aminobenzoyl-glutatmate to peptides, and the enzymatic activities of the abgA and abgB gene products, it has been suggested that AbgT is also a peptide transporter. Demonstration of an energy requirement suggested an H^{+}-dependent mechanism. Expression of these genes is regulated by AbgR and an unknown effector.

== Function ==
As noted above, the AbgT family of transporters has been thought to contribute to bacterial folate biosynthesis by importing the catabolite p-aminobenzoyl-glutamate for producing folate. Approximately 13,000 putative family members were identified in 2015. The X-ray structures of the full-length Alcanivorax borkumensis YdaH (AbgT) and Neisseria gonorrhoeae MtrF proteins. The structures revealed that these two transporters assemble as dimers with architectures distinct from all other families of transporters for which 3-d structures were available. Both YdaH and MtrF are bowl-shaped dimers with a solvent-filled basin extending from the cytoplasm halfway across the membrane bilayer. The protomers of YdaH and MtrF contain nine transmembrane helices and two hairpins which suggested a plausible pathway for substrate transport. A combination of the crystal structure, genetic analyses and substrate accumulation assays indicated that both YdaH and MtrF behave as exporters, capable of removing the folate metabolite p-aminobenzoic acid from bacterial cells. In fact, it was shown that both YdaH and MtrF participate as antibiotic efflux pumps, mediating bacterial resistance to sulfonamide antimetabolite drugs. Possibly, many AbgT-family transporters act as exporters, conferring resistance to sulfonamides.

=== Transport reaction ===
The generalized transport reaction initially proposed for AbgT is:

p-aminobenzoyl-glutamate (out) + nH^{+} (out) → p-aminobenzoyl-glutamate (in) + nH^{+} (in)

but the more recently proposed transport reaction is:

Sulfonamide drugs (in) + H^{+} (out) → Sulfonamide drugs (out) + H^{+} (in)

== See also ==
- Antimicrobial resistance
- Membrane transport protein
- Transporter Classification Database
