= Typhoon Bart (1999) =

Pacific typhoon in 1999

Typhoon Bart (Oniang)
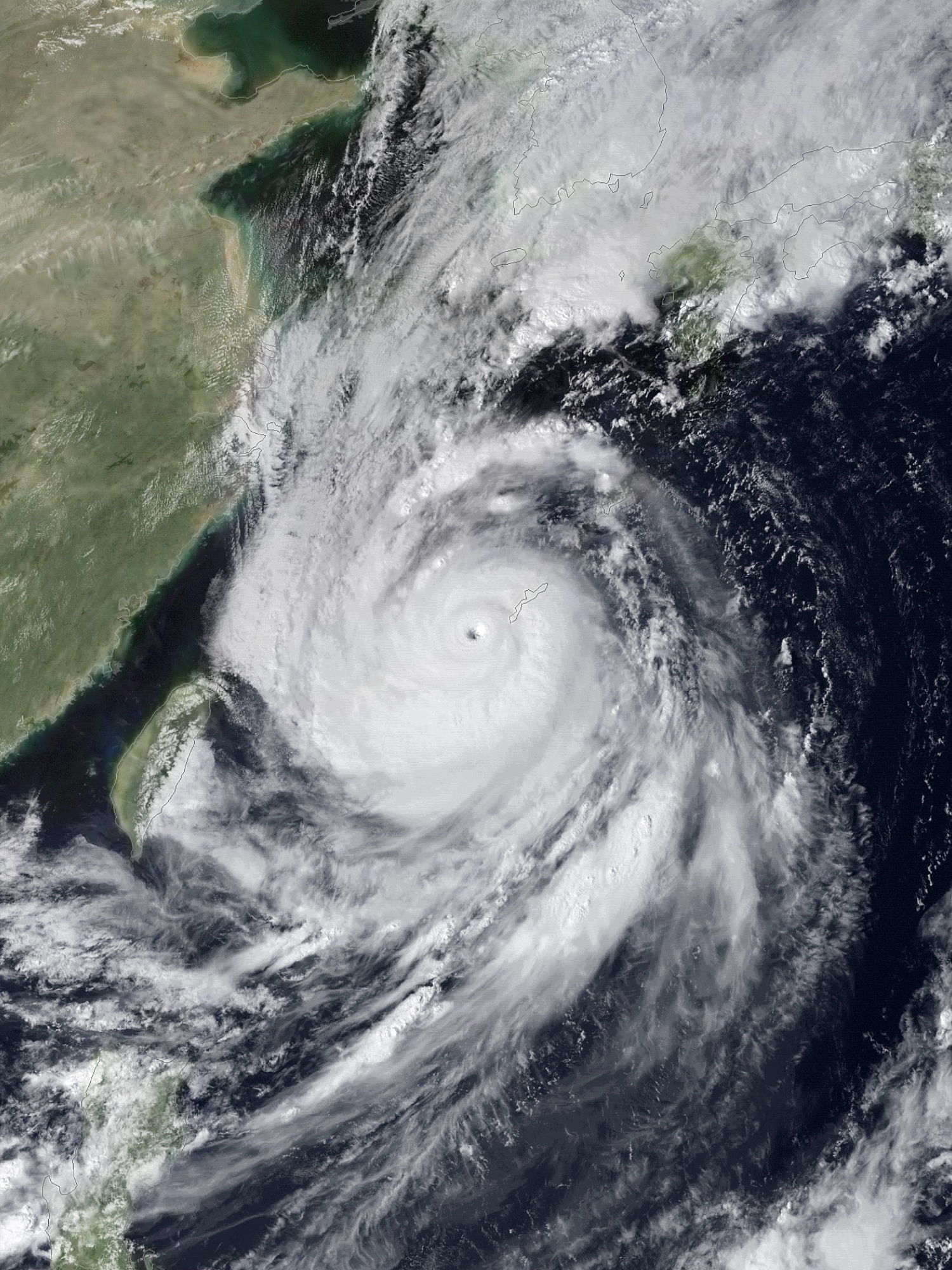
- Typhoon Bart over the Ryukyu Islands on September 22

Meteorological history
- Formed: September 17, 1999
- Extratropical: September 25, 1999
- Dissipated: September 30, 1999

Very strong typhoon
- 10-minute sustained (JMA)
- Highest winds: 165 km/h (105 mph)
- Lowest pressure: 930 hPa (mbar); 27.46 inHg

Category 5-equivalent super typhoon
- 1-minute sustained (SSHWS/JTWC)
- Highest winds: 260 km/h (160 mph)
- Lowest pressure: 898 hPa (mbar); 26.52 inHg

Overall effects
- Fatalities: 36 total
- Injuries: ≥1000 total
- Damage: $1.43 billion (1999 USD)
- Areas affected: Taiwan; Ryukyu Islands; Japan; Korea; Russia
- IBTrACS
- Part of the 1999 Pacific typhoon season

Typhoon Bart, known in the Philippines as Super Typhoon Oniang, was a powerful and destructive typhoon that occurred during the 1999 Pacific typhoon season. It was the only super typhoon of that year. Bart reached "super typhoon" status on September 22, when it grew to comprise winds containing a force of 260 km/h (160 mph). Bart was the last Super Typhoon to have an English name, as traditional Asian names began in the 2000 Pacific Typhoon Season.

Bart killed at least two people on the island of Okinawa and brought over 710 millimeters (28 in) of rain to the island. Kadena Air Base was badly damaged by the typhoon, with over $5 million of damage sustained to the base. Heavy flooding and landslides led to a death toll of 30 and over 1,000 injuries in Japan. Over 800,000 homes lost power, whilst 80,000 were damaged in the aftermath of the storm. The worst damage occurred in Kumamoto Prefecture on the island of Kyūshū, where 16 people died and over 45,000 homes were damaged.

== Meteorological history ==
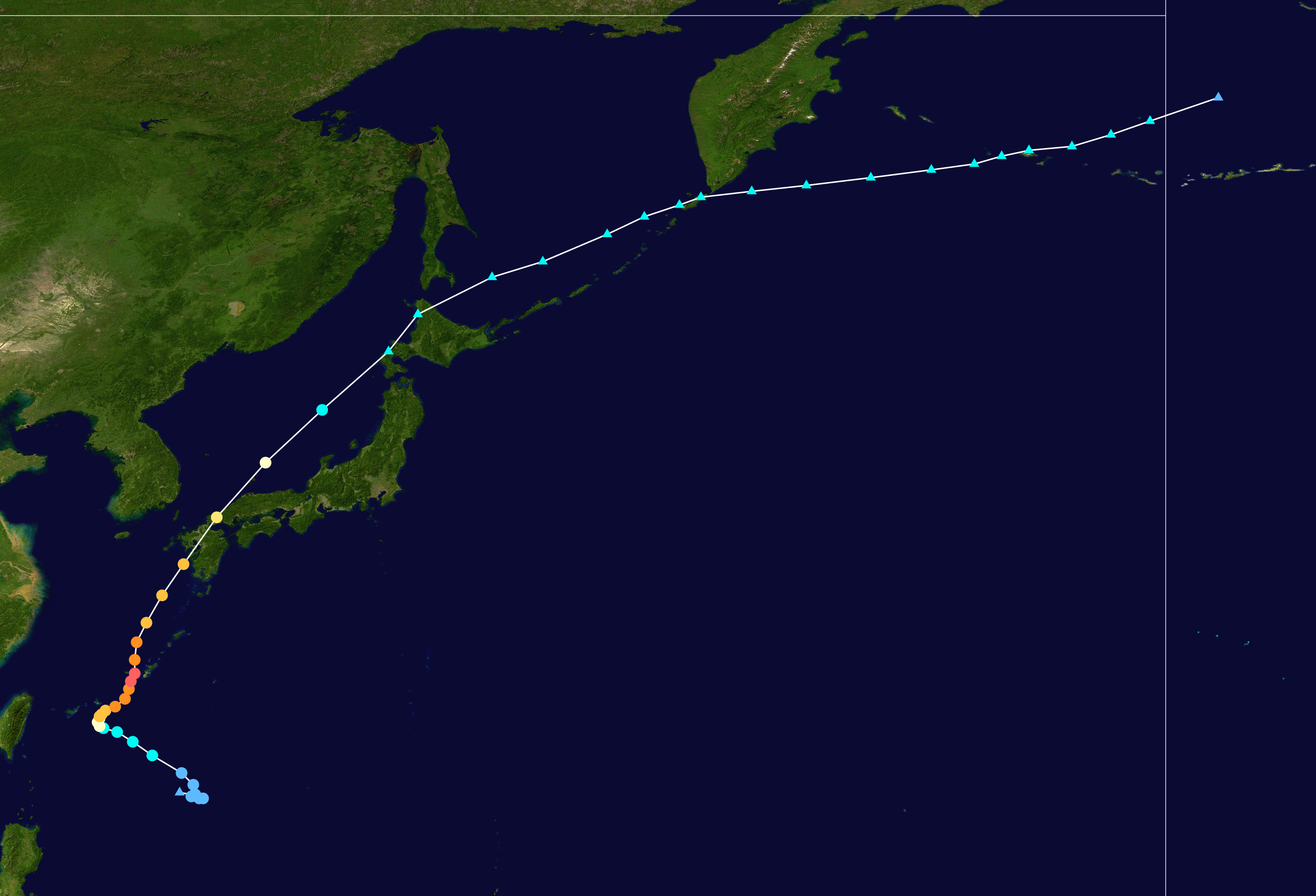
Map plotting the storm's track and intensity, according to the Saffir–Simpson scale Map key Saffir–Simpson scale Tropical depression (≤38 mph, ≤62 km/h) Tropical storm (39–73 mph, 63–118 km/h) Category 1 (74–95 mph, 119–153 km/h) Category 2 (96–110 mph, 154–177 km/h) Category 3 (111–129 mph, 178–208 km/h) Category 4 (130–156 mph, 209–251 km/h) Category 5 (≥157 mph, ≥252 km/h) Unknown Storm type Tropical cyclone Subtropical cyclone Extratropical cyclone, remnant low, tropical disturbance, or monsoon depression

On September 14, an area of disturbed weather formed within the active monsoon trough south of Okinawa. The disturbance began to develop a low-pressure area, but it quickly merged with another collection of thunderstorms to the north. The following day, a new system developed and moved west-southwest. It only slowly organized given suppressed outflow from a nearby tropical upper-tropospheric trough and a lack of cyclonic rotation. The developing system drifted eastward and acquired a surface circulation, which prompted the Joint Typhoon Warning Center (JTWC) to issue a Tropical Cyclone Formation Alert at 03:00 UTC on September 17. This came just three hours after the principal agency in the West Pacific, the Japan Meteorological Agency (JMA), first began monitoring the system. At 15:00 UTC on September 17, the JTWC issued their first advisory on Tropical Depression 24W. The suppressive effects of the trough initially stripped the center of deep atmospheric convection, but as this trough moved northwest and weakened, the surrounding environment began to improve. Both the JMA and JTWC upgraded the depression to Tropical Storm Bart at 00:00 UTC on September 19, at which time the Philippines-based organization PAGASA began warning on Tropical Depression Oniang. Six hours later, PAGASA upgraded the depression to a tropical storm as well.

Some northerly wind shear continued to affect Bart as it moved along a northwesterly course between two subtropical ridges on either side of the cyclone. However, deep convection, originally confined to the southern semicircle of the system, began to wrap around the eastern quadrant as an anticyclone developed aloft. This improving presentation on weather satellite soon yielded the development of an 19 km (12 mi)-diameter eye around 00:00 UTC on September 20, prompting the JTWC to upgrade Bart to a typhoon at this time. While Bart attained increased in intensity, one of the subtropical ridges to its north weakened, causing the system to become nearly stationary while it was positioned about 370 km (230 mi) southwest of Okinawa. A climatological rate of strengthening ensued as the cyclone slowly began to move northward late on September 21, and Bart reached winds of 240 km/h (150 mph) at 18:00 UTC that day, making it a super typhoon based on JTWC classification. By 06:00 UTC on September 22, with an eye that had grown to 39 km (24 mi) and excellent outflow in all directions, Bart attained peak one-minute sustained winds of 260 km/h (160 mph), equivalent to a Category 5 hurricane on the Saffir–Simpson scale. The JMA, meanwhile, recorded ten-minute sustained winds of 165 km/h (103 mph) as the system passed only 75 km (47 mi) west of Okinawa.

Later on September 22, the potent cyclone began to feel the effects of dry air entrainment into its circulation. The eye diameter fell to 14 km (8.7 mi) and continued to shrink, and soon, Bart began to undergo an eyewall replacement cycle as it fell below super typhoon intensity. An approaching trough in the mid-latitudes and an intensifying ridge to its northeast caused the cyclone to accelerate in that direction, while microwave imagery depicted a newly formed, symmetric 74 km (46 mi) eye. The system made landfall near Omuta in Kyushu, the southwesternmost island of Japan, and it soon crossed Honshu. This movement brought Bart into the Sea of Japan to the west of Hiroshima by 00:00 UTC on September 24, around which time it further decayed into a tropical storm. The effects of land were exacerbated by an increase in strong southwesterly wind shear as Bart continued to accelerate northeastward. The JTWC declared the system an extratropical cyclone at 15:00 UTC on September 24, and the JMA followed suit over subsequent hours as the non-tropical low moved into the Sea of Okhotsk east of northern Hokkaido. The remnants of Bart continued into the North Pacific.

== Impact ==
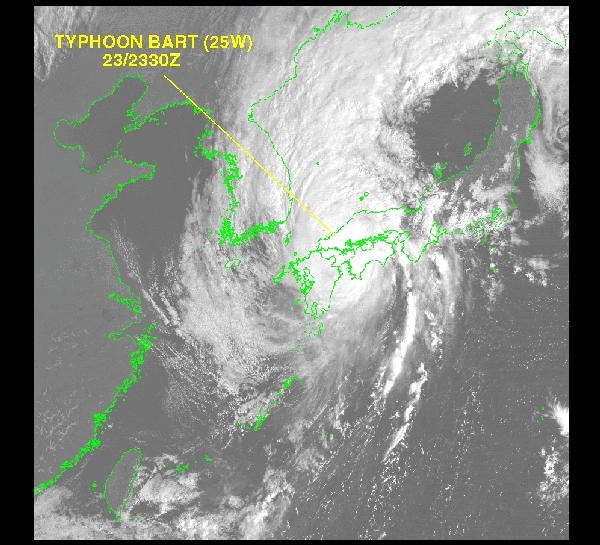
Bart making landfall in Japan.

As Bart overspread much of Japan and combined with a cold front, it yielded numerous reports of rainfall accumulations in excess of 510 mm (20 in). The highest recorded value was 1,180 mm (46 in) in Funato, located in the Kōchi Prefecture. Heavy rains caused flooding, which was exacerbated by swollen rivers. The cyclone also produced numerous tropical storm- or typhoon-force winds across the island, peaking at 151 km/h (94 mph) across Seto in the Ehime Prefecture. The inclement weather caused over 245 landslides and damaged or destroyed buildings. Strong winds downed numerous trees, contributing to additional damage to structures. Ferry service connecting the various prefectures was cancelled, airline flights were halted, train service was severely disrupted, large ships moored along the coast were evacuated, and many schools were closed. Numerous people were evacuated throughout the region. In total, Bart caused 36 fatalities, injured over 1,314 people, flooded 18,498 homes, and left 813,000 households without power.

In Okinawa, downed trees, flooded roads, and overturned cars were prevalent, forcing the U.S. military to restrict personnel and their families to their homes. In the Gifu Prefecture, landslides collapsed roads, leading to eight deaths and eight injuries. In the Yamaguchi Prefecture, the collapse of a wall in Yamaguchi City killed two people, while another person died from strong winds in Ohata Town. The storm shuttered production units at a Seibu Oil company. In the Hiroshima Prefecture, two large cranes under construction collapsed and hit a nearby office, killing three employees. Two more people died in Shimamachi and Tomoda. Along the coastline, a pier suffered structural damage, and thousands of oyster farming rafts were damaged. The Itsukushima Shrine, one of Japan's most famous Shinto shrines and a member of the United Nations' World Cultural Heritage List, was damaged. Three people were killed in the Fukuoka Prefecture, where firefighters traveled by rubber boat to search for missing people. In the Kumamoto Prefecture, more than 30 police officers were sent to Shiranui, conducting search and rescue in homes that were flooded to their rooftops by a storm surge up to 3.5 m (11 ft) that funneled into Yatsushiro Sea. The surge coincided with the peak timing of the spring tide, killing 13 people. Another three people died from head injuries caused by flying debris. Forty-three municipalities in the prefecture set up disaster response headquarters. The trade office was closed and suffered minor damage, but it was expected to swiftly reopen following the passage of the storm. In the Kagoshima Prefecture, strong winds downed a steel tower which contributed to power and water outages through September 28. In the Miyazaki Prefecture, the collapse of a road caused a man to plunge into the Gokase River and die.

Bart also spawned a tornado outbreak. The first tornado, rated F0–F1 in strength, occurred in the Nagasaki Prefecture late on September 23. This was succeeded by tornadoes of F1 and F2 intensity in the Kochi and Yamaguchi prefectures, respectively. The four other tornadoes occurred in the Aichi Prefecture; two were rated F1, one was rated F2, and one was rated F3. The majority of damage during the outbreak was associated with the F3 tornado which grew up to 550 m (600 yd) and tracked for 18 km (11 mi). The tornado completely demolished 40 houses and damaged 309 others, resulting in 415 injuries. The F2 in the Aichi Prefecture also destroyed a house and damaged two others; it caused 38 injuries. The F2 in the Yamaguchi Prefecture injured 13 people. These tornadoes occurred in the right front quadrant of the typhoon, a historically favorable quadrant for tornadic activity. The presence of high convective available potential energy and strong wind shear favored the development of supercell thunderstorms across Japan on September 23–24. Damages totaled to ¥163.1 billion (US$1.43 billion).

== See also ==
- Other storms of the same name
- 1999 Pacific typhoon season
- Typhoon Yancy (1993)
