= Gluconate-proton symporter =

Gluconate:H^{+} Symporter

Identifiers
- Symbol: GntP
- Pfam: PF02447
- InterPro: IPR003474
- TCDB: 2.A.8
Available protein structures:
- PDB: IPR003474 PF02447 (ECOD; PDBsum)
- AlphaFold: IPR003474; PF02447

The gluconate:H^{+} symporter (GntP) family (TC# 2.A.8) is a family of transport proteins belonging to the ion transporter (IT) superfamily. Members of the GntP family include known gluconate permeases of E. coli and Bacillus species such as the D-Gluconate:H^{+} symporter of Bacillus subtillus (GntP; TC# 2.A.8.1.1) and the D-fructuronate/D-gluconate:H^{+} symporter of E. coli (GntP; TC# 2.A.8.1.3). A representative list of proteins belonging to the GntP family can be found in the Transporter Classification Database.

== Structure ==
Bioinformatic analysis suggests these proteins are of about 450 residues and possess 12 or 14 putative transmembrane α-helical spanners. No crystal structure data are available for GntP proteins as of early 2016.

== Function ==
Four of the seven E. coli paralogues have been found to possess active gluconate uptake activity, and one of them (GntW; TC# 2.A.8.1.2) can accommodate both L-idonate and D-gluconate, although L-idonate is the physiological substrate. Another (GntP) transports D-gluconate with high affinity but is specifically induced by and transports D-fructuronate. GntT of E. coli is the physiological gluconate permease.

=== Transport reaction ===
The generalized transport reaction catalyzed by proteins of the GntP family is:

Carbohydrate acid (out) + nH^{+} (out) → Carbohydrate acid (in) + nH^{+} (in)
