= Dcu family =

Anaerobic c4-dicarboxylate membrane transporter

Identifiers
- Symbol: DcuA_DcuB
- Pfam: PF03605
- Pfam clan: CL0182
- InterPro: IPR004668
- TCDB: 2.A.13
Available protein structures:
- PDB: IPR004668 PF03605 (ECOD; PDBsum)
- AlphaFold: IPR004668; PF03605

The C4-dicarboxylate uptake family or Dcu family (TC# 2.A.13) is a family of transmembrane ion transporters found in bacteria. Their function is to exchange dicarboxylates such as aspartate, malate, fumarate and succinate.

== Structure ==
Many members of this family are predicted to have 11 or 12 transmembrane regions (TMSs); however, one member of this family (Uncharacterized protein of Encarsia pergandiella symbiont, Cardinium hertigii, strain cEper1; TC# 2.A.13.2.1) is reported to have 10 transmembrane regions, with both the N- and C-termini localized to the periplasm. For DcuA, the 'positive inside' rule is obeyed, and two putative TMSs are localized to a cytoplasmic loop between TMSs 5 and 6 and in the C-terminal periplasmic region. The fully sequenced proteins are of fairly uniform size, from 434-446 amino acyl residues in length.

There are no crystal structures available for members of the Dcu family.

== Function ==
The two E. coli proteins, DcuA (TC# 2.A.13.1.1) and DcuB (TC# 2.A.13.1.2), of the Dcu family are involved in the transport of aspartate, malate, fumarate and succinate, functioning as antiporters with any two of these substrates. They exhibit 36% identity with 63% similarity, and both transport fumarate in exchange for succinate with the same affinity (30 μM). Since DcuA is encoded in an operon with the gene for aspartase, and DcuB is encoded in an operon with the gene for fumarase, their physiological functions may be to catalyse aspartate:fumarate and fumarate:malate exchange during the anaerobic utilization of aspartate and fumarate, respectively. The two transporters can apparently substitute for each other under certain physiological conditions.

The generalized transport reaction catalyzed by the proteins of the Dcu family is:

Dicarboxylate_{1} (out) + Dicarboxylate_{2} (in) ⇌ Dicarboxylate_{1} (in) + Dicarboxylate_{2} (out).

== Expression ==
The Escherichia coli DcuA and DcuB proteins have very different expression patterns. DcuA is constitutively expressed; DcuB is strongly induced anaerobically by FNR and C4-dicarboxylates, while it is repressed by nitrate and subject to CRP-mediated catabolite repression.

== See also ==
- DcuC family
