= Arsenite-transporting ATPase =

Class of enzymes

arsenite transmembrane-transporting ATPase

Identifiers
- EC no.: 3.6.3.16

Databases
- IntEnz: IntEnz view
- BRENDA: BRENDA entry
- ExPASy: NiceZyme view
- KEGG: KEGG entry
- MetaCyc: metabolic pathway
- PRIAM: profile
- PDB structures: RCSB PDB PDBe PDBsum
- Gene Ontology: AmiGO / QuickGO
Search
- PMC: articles
- PubMed: articles
- NCBI: proteins

In enzymology, an arsenite-transporting ATPase (EC 3.6.3.16) is an enzyme that catalyzes the chemical reaction

ATP + H_{2}O + arsenitein $\rightleftharpoons$ ADP + phosphate + arseniteout

The 3 substrates of this enzyme are ATP, H_{2}O, and arsenite, whereas its 3 products are ADP, phosphate, and arsenite.

This enzyme belongs to the family of hydrolases, specifically those acting on acid anhydrides acting on acid anhydrides to catalyse transmembrane movement of substances. The systematic name of this enzyme class is ATP phosphohydrolase (arsenite-exporting).

== Structural studies ==
As of late 2007, 3 structures have been solved for this class of enzymes, with PDB accession codes PDB: 1IHU, PDB: 1II0, and PDB: 1II9.

== See also ==
- Arsenite-Antimonite efflux
