= Lactate permease family =

Lactate permease

Identifiers
- Symbol: LctP
- Pfam: PF02652
- InterPro: IPR003804
- TCDB: 2.A.14
Available protein structures:
- Pfam: structures / ECOD
- PDB: RCSB PDB; PDBe; PDBj
- PDBsum: structure summary

The lactate permease (LctP) family (TC# 2.A.14) is a family of transport proteins belonging to the ion transporter (IT) superfamily.

== Function ==
Characterized members of this family possess 15-18 transmembrane segments (TMSs) and are roughly 460-565 amino acyl residues in length.

=== General transport reaction ===
Transport reactions catalyzed by functionally characterized members of the LctP family include:

D- or L-lactate or glycolate (out) + H^{+} (out) → D- or L-lactate or glycolate (in) + H^{+} (in).
