= Inorganic phosphate transporter family =

The inorganic phosphate transporter (PiT) family is a group of carrier proteins derived from Gram-negative and Gram-positive bacteria, archaea, and eukaryotes.

== Function ==
Functionally-characterized members of the family appear to catalyze inorganic phosphate (P_{i}) or inorganic sulfate uptake either by H^{+} or Na^{+} symport. Both PitA (TC# 2.A.20.1.1) and PitB (TC# 2.A.20.1.2) of E. coli probably catalyze metal ion·phosphate:H^{+} symport, where Mg^{2+}, Ca^{2+} or Zn^{2+} (and probably other divalent cations) can complex with P_{i}. The mammalian proteins (i.e., TC# 2.A.20.2.7) have been reported to function as viral receptors, but they undoubtedly function as transport proteins as well. For numerous gammaretroviruses, such as the gibbon ape leukemia virus, woolly monkey virus, feline leukemia virus subgroup B, feline leukemia virus subgroup T, and 10A1 murine leukemia virus, this receptor is the human type III sodium-dependent inorganic phosphate transporter, SLC20A1, also known as PiT1.

The malaria parasite, Plasmodium falciparum, grows within its host erythrocyte and induces an increase in the permeability of the erythrocyte membrane to a range of solutes including Na^{+} and K^{+}. This results in a progressive increase in the concentration of Na^{+} in the erythrocyte cytosol. The parasite cytosol has a relatively low Na^{+} concentration, generating a large inward Na^{+} gradient across the parasite plasma membrane. Saliba et al. (2006) showed that the parasite exploits the Na^{+} electrochemical gradient to energize the uptake of inorganic phosphate (P_{i}) with a stoichiometry of 2Na^{+}:1P_{i} and with an apparent preference for the monovalent over the divalent form of P_{i} (see TC #2.A.20.2.5).

The generalized transport reactions possibly catalyzed by members of the PiT family are:

1. HPO^{2−}_{4} (out) + [nH^{+} or Na^{+}] (out) → HPO^{2−}_{4} (in) + [nH^{+} or Na^{+}] (in)
2. Me^{2+} · HPO^{2−}_{4} (out) + nH^{+} (out) → Me^{2+} · HPO^{2−}_{4} (in) + nH^{+} (in)
3. SO^{2−}_{4} (out) + nH^{+} (out) → SO^{2−}_{4} (in) + nH^{+} (in).

== Structure ==
The molecular sizes of Pit family members are reported to vary from 354 to 681 residues (10-12 TMSs) with the mammalian and Plasmodium proteins exhibiting the largest sizes. The sulfate permease of B. subtilis, CysP, is of 354 residues with 11 putative TMSs. As of early 2016, it appears no crystal structures are available for PiT proteins.

== Phylogeny ==
Phylogenetic grouping of the phosphate transport proteins generally correlates with organismal phylogeny. Thus the fungal, plant, animal and archaeal proteins each cluster separately. However, the tree exhibits two clusters of bacterial phosphate transport proteins. One bacterial cluster is distant from the eukaryotic proteins while the other cluster is close to the plant proteins. Both clusters include proteins from Gram-negative and Gram-positive bacteria. The sulfate permease, CysP (TC# 2.A.20.4.1), is distantly related to the phosphate permeases.

Members of the PiT family arose by a tandem internal gene duplication event. Surprisingly, TopPred predicts a 12 TMS topology for the yeast Pho89 protein, but the homologous regions are not predicted to show similar topological features.

== See also ==
- SLC20A1
- Phosphate permease
- Transporter Classification Database
