= DcuC family =

C4-dicarboxylate anaerobic carrier

Identifiers
- Symbol: DcuC
- Pfam: PF03606
- Pfam clan: CL0182
- InterPro: IPR018385
- TCDB: 9.B.50
Available protein structures:
- PDB: IPR018385 PF03606 (ECOD; PDBsum)
- AlphaFold: IPR018385; PF03606

The C_{4}-dicarboxylate uptake C family or DcuC family (TC# 2.A.61) is a family of transmembrane ion transporters found in bacteria. A representative list of proteins belonging to the DcuC family can be found in the Transporter Classification Database.

An anaerobic C_{4}-dicarboxylate transporter (DcuC) of E. coli (TC# 2.A.61.1.1) has 14 putative transmembrane regions, is induced only under anaerobic conditions, and is not repressed by glucose. DcuC may therefore function as a succinate efflux system during anaerobic glucose fermentation. However, when overexpressed, it can replace either DcuA or DcuB in catalysing fumarate-succinate exchange and fumarate uptake. DcuC shows the same transport modes as DcuA and DcuB (exchange, uptake, and presumably efflux of C4-dicarboxylates).

The reactions probably catalyzed by the E. coli DcuC protein are:

1. C_{4}-dicarboxylate (out) + nH+ (out) → C_{4}-dicarboxylate (in) + nH+ (in)
2. C_{4}-dicarboxylate_{1} (out) + C_{4}-dicarboxylate_{2} (in) ⇌ C_{4}-dicarboxylate_{1} (in) + C_{4}-dicarboxylate_{2} (out).

== See also ==
- Dicarboxylate
- Dcu family
