= SLC13A2 =

Protein-coding gene in the species Homo sapiens

Identifiers
- Aliases: SLC13A2, NADC1, NaCT, NaDC-1, SDCT1, solute carrier family 13 member 2
- External IDs: OMIM: 604148; MGI: 1276558; GeneCards: SLC13A2

Gene location (Human)
Chr.	Chromosome 17 (human)
Band	17q11.2	Start	28,473,293 bp
Band	17q11.2	End	28,497,781 bp

Gene location (Mouse)
Chr.	Chromosome 11 (mouse)
Band	11 B5|11 46.74 cM	Start	78,287,913 bp
Band	11 B5|11 46.74 cM	End	78,313,043 bp
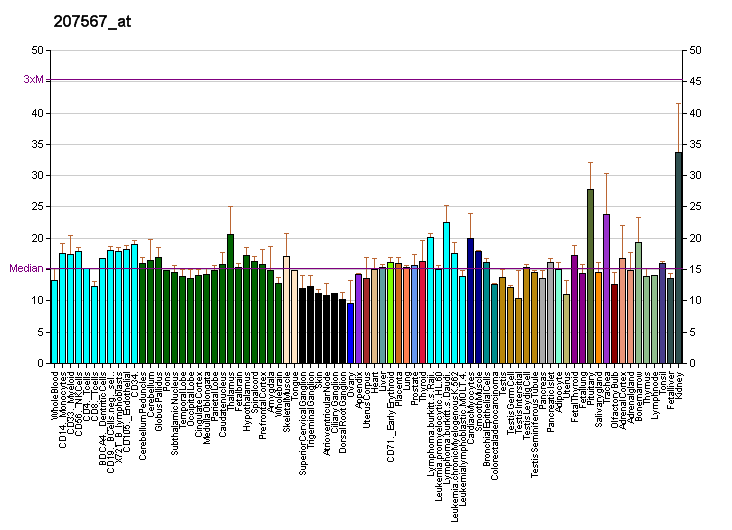
RNA expression pattern
Bgee	Human / Mouse (ortholog); Top expressed in: jejunal mucosa; duodenum; testicle; human kidney; olfactory zone of nasal mucosa; salivary gland; minor salivary glands; lactiferous duct; mucosa of ileum; mucosa of transverse colon / Top expressed in: intestinal villus; jejunum; right kidney; left colon; proximal tubule; ileum; human kidney; conjunctival fornix; morula; epithelium of small intestine; More reference expression data
BioGPS	More reference expression data
Gene ontology
Molecular function	low-affinity sodium:dicarboxylate symporter activity; symporter activity; transporter activity
Cellular component	integral component of membrane; plasma membrane; integral component of plasma membrane; extracellular exosome; membrane
Biological process	ion transport; sodium ion transport; dicarboxylic acid transport; transmembrane transport; anion transmembrane transport; transport
Sources:Amigo / QuickGO
Orthologs
Databases	NCBI: entry; OMA: entry
Species	Human	Mouse
Entrez	9058	20500
Ensembl	ENSG00000007216	ENSMUSG00000001095
UniProt	Q13183	Q9ES88
RefSeq (mRNA)	NM_001145975; NM_001145976; NM_003984; NM_001346683; NM_001346684	NM_022411
RefSeq (protein)	NP_001139447; NP_001333612; NP_001333613; NP_003975	NP_071856
Location (UCSC)	Chr 17: 28.47 – 28.5 Mb	Chr 11: 78.29 – 78.31 Mb
PubMed search
- Wikidata
View/Edit Human	View/Edit Mouse

Solute carrier family 13 member 2 is a protein that is encoded in humans by the SLC13A2 gene.
