= Inorganic pyrophosphatase =

Group of proteins having inorganic pyrophosphatase activity

inorganic pyrophosphatase
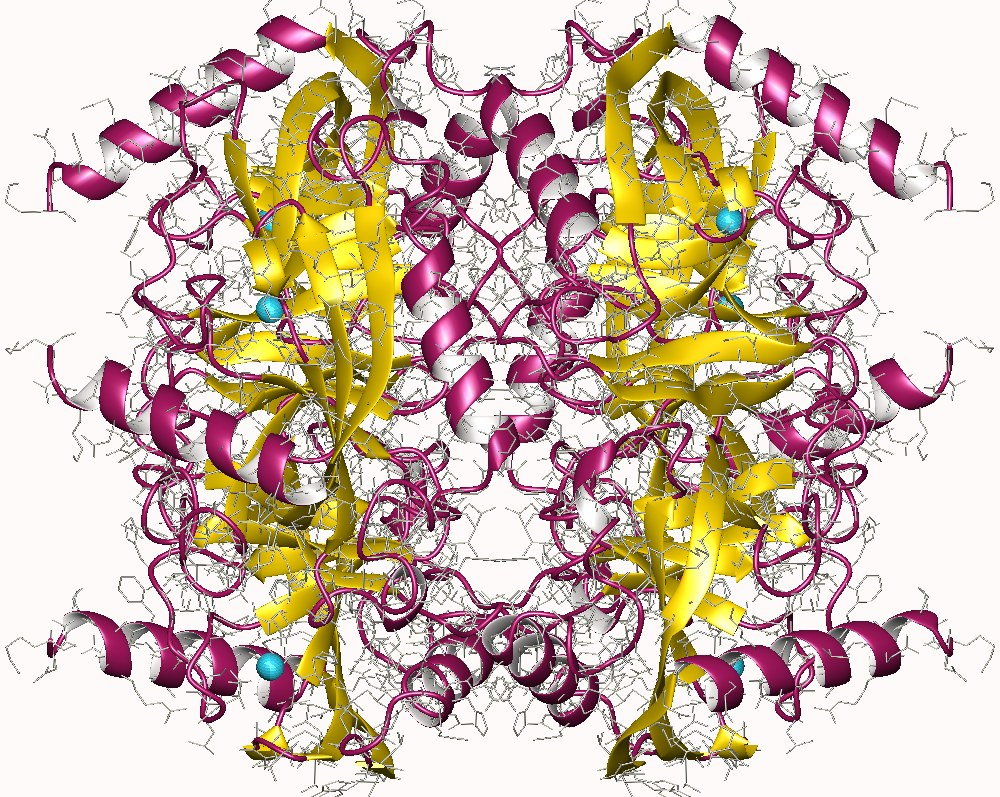
- Pyrophosphatase (inorganic) hexamer, E.Coli

Identifiers
- EC no.: 3.6.1.1
- CAS no.: 9024-82-2

Databases
- BRENDA: enzyme data
- ExPASy: NiceZyme view
- KEGG: enzyme entry
- MetaCyc: metabolic pathway
- Rhea: reactions
- PDB structures: RCSB PDB PDBe PDBsum
- Gene Ontology: AmiGO / QuickGO
Search
- PMC: articles
- PubMed: articles
- NCBI: proteins

Soluble inorganic pyrophosphatase
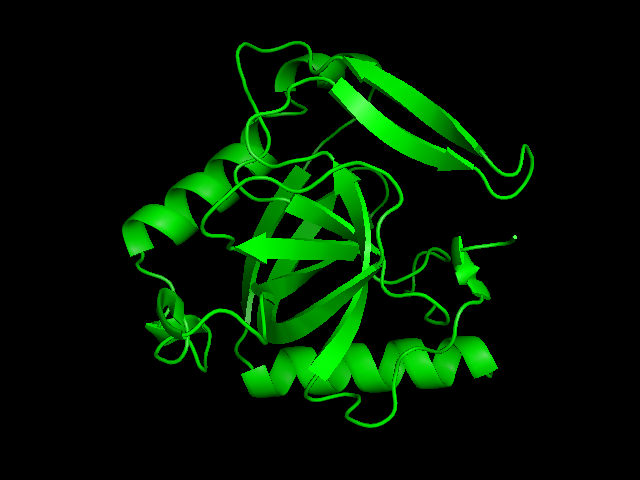
- Structure of soluble inorganic pyrophosphatase, isolated from Thermococcus litoralis (PDB: 2PRD).

Identifiers
- Symbol: Pyrophosphatase
- Pfam: PF00719
- InterPro: IPR008162
- PROSITE: PS00387
- CATH: 2prd
- SCOP2: 2prd / SCOPe / SUPFAM
- CDD: cd00412
Available protein structures:
- PDB: IPR008162 PF00719 (ECOD; PDBsum)
- AlphaFold: IPR008162; PF00719

pyrophosphatase (inorganic) 1

Identifiers
- Symbol: PPA1
- Alt. symbols: PP
- NCBI gene: 5464
- HGNC: 9226
- OMIM: 179030
- RefSeq: NM_021129
- UniProt: Q15181

Other data
- Locus: Chr. 10 q11.1-q24
Search for
- Structures: Swiss-model
- Domains: InterPro

pyrophosphatase (inorganic) 2

Identifiers
- Symbol: PPA2
- NCBI gene: 27068
- HGNC: 28883
- OMIM: 609988
- RefSeq: NM_176869
- UniProt: Q9H2U2

Other data
- Locus: Chr. 4 q25
Search for
- Structures: Swiss-model
- Domains: InterPro

Inorganic pyrophosphatase (or inorganic diphosphatase, PPase) is an enzyme (EC 3.6.1.1) that catalyzes the conversion of one ion of pyrophosphate to two phosphate ions. This is a highly exergonic reaction, and therefore can be coupled to unfavorable biochemical transformations in order to drive these transformations to completion. The functionality of this enzyme plays a critical role in lipid metabolism (including lipid synthesis and degradation), calcium absorption and bone formation, and DNA synthesis, as well as other biochemical transformations.

Two types of inorganic diphosphatase, very different in terms of both amino acid sequence and structure, have been characterised to date: soluble and transmembrane proton-pumping pyrophosphatases (sPPases and H(^{+})-PPases, respectively). sPPases are ubiquitous proteins that hydrolyse pyrophosphate to release heat, whereas H^{+}-PPases, so far unidentified in animal and fungal cells, couple the energy of PPi hydrolysis to proton movement across biological membranes.

== Structure ==
Thermostable soluble pyrophosphatase had been isolated from the extremophile Thermococcus litoralis. The 3-dimensional structure was determined using x-ray crystallography, and was found to consist of two alpha-helices, as well as an antiparallel closed beta-sheet. The form of inorganic pyrophosphatase isolated from Thermococcus litoralis was found to contain a total of 174 amino acid residues and have a hexameric oligomeric organization (Image 1).

Humans possess two genes encoding pyrophosphatase, PPA1 and PPA2. PPA1 has been assigned to a gene locus on human chromosome 10, and PPA2 to chromosome 4.

== Mechanism ==
Though the precise mechanism of catalysis via inorganic pyrophosphatase in most organisms remains uncertain, site-directed mutagenesis studies in Escherichia coli have allowed for analysis of the enzyme active site and identification of key amino acids. In particular, this analysis has revealed 17 residues of that may be of functional importance in catalysis.

Further research suggests that the protonation state of Asp67 is responsible for modulating the reversibility of the reaction in Escherichia coli. The carboxylate functional group of this residue has been shown to perform a nucleophilic attack on the pyrophosphate substrate when four magnesium ions are present. Direct coordination with these four magnesium ions and hydrogen bonding interactions with Arg43, Lys29, and Lys142 (all positively charged residues) have been shown to anchor the substrate to the active site. The four magnesium ions are also suggested to be involved in the stabilization of the trigonal bipyramid transition state, which lowers the energetic barrier for the aforementioned nucleophilic attack.

Several studies have also identified additional substrates that can act as allosteric effectors. In particular, the binding of pyrophosphate (PPi) to the effector site of inorganic pyrophosphatase increases its rate of hydrolysis at the active site. ATP has also been shown to function as an allosteric activator in Escherichia coli, while fluoride has been shown to inhibit hydrolysis of pyrophosphate in yeast.

== Biological function and significance ==
The hydrolysis of inorganic pyrophosphate (PPi) to two phosphate ions is utilized in many biochemical pathways to render reactions effectively irreversible. This process is highly exergonic (accounting for approximately a −19kJ change in free energy), and therefore greatly increases the energetic favorability of reaction system when coupled with a typically less-favorable reaction.

Inorganic pyrophosphatase catalyzes this hydrolysis reaction in the early steps of lipid degradation, a prominent example of this phenomenon. By promoting the rapid hydrolysis of pyrophosphate (PPi), Inorganic pyrophosphatase provides the driving force for the activation of fatty acids destined for beta oxidation.

Before fatty acids can undergo degradation to fulfill the metabolic needs of an organism, they must first be activated via a thioester linkage to coenzyme A. This process is catalyzed by the enzyme acyl-CoA synthetase, and occurs on the outer mitochondrial membrane. This activation is accomplished in two reactive steps: (1) the fatty acid reacts with a molecule of ATP to form an enzyme-bound acyl adenylate and pyrophosphate (PPi), and (2) the sulfhydryl group of CoA attacks the acyl adenylate, forming acyl CoA and a molecule of AMP. Each of these two steps is reversible under biological conditions, save for the additional hydrolysis of PPi by inorganic pyrophosphatase. This coupled hydrolysis provides the driving force for the overall forward activation reaction, and serves as a source of inorganic phosphate used in other biological processes.

== Evolution ==
Examination of prokaryotic and eukaryotic forms of soluble inorganic pyrophosphatase (sPPase, Pfam PF00719) has shown that they differ significantly in both amino acid sequence, number of residues, and oligomeric organization. Despite differing structural components, recent work has suggested a large degree of evolutionary conservation of active site structure as well as reaction mechanism, based on kinetic data. Analysis of approximately one million genetic sequences taken from organisms in the Sargasso Sea identified a 57 residue sequence within the regions coding for proton-pumping inorganic pyrophosphatase (H^{+}-PPase) that appears to be highly conserved; this region primarily consisted of the four early amino acid residues Gly, Ala, Val and Asp, suggesting an evolutionarily ancient origin for the protein.
