= Kerstin Albertsson Wikland =

Swedish researcher and professor

Kerstin Albertsson Wikland (5 July 1947–8 October 2024) was a Swedish researcher and professor of pediatric growth research at the Sahlgrenska Academy, University of Gothenburg.

Albertsson Wikland's research focused primarily on children's growth and development. She was appointed professor on September 1, 1994, and made contributions to the field of pediatric endocrinology.

In 2006, she faced allegations regarding administrative irregularities, leading to speculation about her potential dismissal from the university. A subsequent investigation concluded that while there were procedural inconsistencies related to procurement and certification, she had not committed any illegal actions. As a result, she was docked 20 days' salary.

For her contributions to pediatric endocrinology, Albertsson Wikland was awarded the Andrea Prader Prize in 2017.
