= SLC13A5 citrate transporter disorder =

Neurological disease

SLC13A5 Epilepsy
- Other names: SLC13A5 citrate transporter disorder Citrate Transporter Disorder; SLC13A5 Deficiency; Early Infantile Epilepsy Encephalopathy 25 (EIEE25); Developmental Epilepsy Encephalopathy 25 (DEE25); Kohlschutter-Tonz Syndrome (non-ROGDI)
- Symptoms: Seizures; Ataxia; Dystonia; Developmental delay Enamel hypoplasia
- Usual onset: Birth
- Causes: Mutation in the SLC13A5 gene
- Frequency: Rare disease

SLC13A5 citrate transporter disorder, or SLC13A5 Epilepsy, is a rare genetic spectrum disorder that presents with neurological symptoms. Symptoms include severe seizures, ataxia, dystonia, teeth hypoplasia, poor communication skills, difficulty standing or walking, as well as developmental delay.

SLC13A5 Epilepsy is due to dysfunction of the SLC13A5 gene, typically due to inherited mutations in both copies of SLC13A5. This disorder follows autosomal recessive inheritance patterns. Diagnosis is suspected based on symptoms and confirmed by genetic testing.

Individuals with SLC13A5 Epilepsy require an accurate diagnosis to receive proper treatment. Diagnosis and care are critical, as these patients are dependent upon caregivers throughout their lives.

== Signs and symptoms ==
The most common symptoms of SLC13A5 Epilepsy are seizures, delayed neurological development, and significant defects in tooth development. Other symptoms include ataxia, dystonia, global developmental delay, and intellectual disability. People with SLC13A5 Epilepsy have widely spaced teeth but no facial dysmorphism.

=== Nervous System ===
People with SLC13A5 Epilepsy present with severe, convulsive multi-focal seizures leading to status epilepticus within the first few weeks of life. They continue to have seizures of varying type (focal, multi-focal, generalized, tonic-clonic, etc), frequency, and severity for the rest of their lives. Unfortunately, these seizures are poorly controlled by medications.

People with SLC13A5 Epilepsy also experience combinations of spasticity, dystonia (involuntary contraction of muscles), ataxia (poor motor coordination), and choreoathetosis (involuntary twitching or writhing).

=== Dental and Oral ===
People with SLC13A5 Epilepsy often have enamel hypoplasia, leading to widely spaced teeth, teeth hypoplasia, hypodontia, and gingival hyperplasia.

=== Development ===
People with SLC13A5 Epilepsy present with varying degrees of developmental delay. Developmental delay is often obvious by 6 months of age, with lack of rolling, inability to demonstrate head support, and poor eye contact. Walking without support and speech onset are also delayed. People with SLC13A5 Epilepsy also present with varying levels of intellectual disability and limited ability to speak.

== Pathophysiology ==
Mutation in the SLC13A5 gene can cause neonatal seizures in the first few days of life. This condition is known as early infantile epileptic encephalopathy 25. The protein encoded by the gene belongs to a solute carrier family, numbered as 13. It was discovered in 2002 that it binds preferentially to and transports citrate anions. It is known as Na^{+}-coupled citrate transporter (NaCT), and is also referred to by the gene name SLC13A5.

The mutations in SLC13A5 lead to various effects on the translated NaCT protein to cause loss of citrate transport. These are divided into two classes: insufficient protein at the plasma membrane due to premature truncation or trafficking defects, or mutations that block substrate binding or the protein's catalytic cycle.

== Citrate deficiency ==
The disorder is caused by loss of function mutations in the SLC13A5 gene, with impact on citrate transport into cells. Patients typically suffer seizures in the first week of life, and develop a form of drug-resistant epilepsy.

== Diagnosis ==
SLC13A5 disorder is an autosomal recessive disease, and its genetic diagnosis can be carried out by exome sequencing. The cause is biallelic loss of function, or in other words the disorder occurs when each of the two copies of the gene in the patient is mutated. For practical reasons sequencing of an epilepsy-related panel of genes may replace analysis of the whole exome.

== Treatment ==
Results on ketogenic diet and drug treatment with triheptanoin are unclear. In 2021 Taysha Gene Therapies announced recognition for their TSHA-105 gene therapy as an orphan drug, by the FDA and European Commission.
