= Focal palmoplantar and gingival keratosis =

- Focal palmoplantar and gingival keratosis is an autosomal dominant disorder.
- Specialty: Dermatology

Focal palmoplantar and gingival keratosis is a rare autosomal dominant disease whose clinical features, and in particular, pathologic alterations and molecular mechanisms remains to be well defined.

== See also ==
- Digitate dermatosis
- List of cutaneous conditions
