= Tobacco acid pyrophosphatase =

Tobacco Acid Pyrophosphatase (TAP) is an enzyme that catalyses the hydrolysis of a phosphoric ester bond in a broad spectrum of molecules, including the 5'-end of mRNA.

During mRNA maturation the 5' triphosphate of the new mRNA molecule is rapidly removed. The diphosphate 5' end then attacks the α-phosphorus atom of a methylated GTP to form a very unusual 5'-5' triphosphate linkage, called cap. In molecular biology, TAP is used to hydrolyse a phosphodiester bond of this particular structure and release a mRNA molecule with only one phosphate group in the 5'-end, for instance in protocols for RACE (Rapid Amplification of cDNA Ends).

Commercial production of TAP was discontinued in 2015, however Cap-Clip acid pyrophosphatase has been found to perform nearly identically in genome-wide studies.
