= Palmoplantar keratoderma with deafness =

- Other names: Keratoderma palmoplantar, with deafness, Palmoplantar keratoderma and sensorineural deafness, Hereditary palmoplantar keratoderma with deafness (subtype), Focal palmoplantar keratoderma with sensorineural deafness (subtype), Diffuse palmoplantar keratoderma with deafness (subtype).
- Specialty: Medical genetics, Dermatology
- Symptoms: Mainly palmoplantar keratoderma and hearing loss
- Complications: Hearing impairment
- Usual onset: Early
- Duration: Lifelong (but can be treated, especially the deafness part)
- Types: Hereditary, focal, and Diffuse
- Causes: Genetic mutation
- Prevention: None
- Prognosis: Good to Medium
- Frequency: rare
- Deaths: -

Palmoplantar keratoderma with deafness, also known as Palmoplantar keratoderma-deafness syndrome, is a rare genetic disorder which is characterized by either focal or diffuse early-onset palmoplantar keratoderma and sensorineural deafness. Transmission is autosomal dominant with incomplete penetrance.

== Signs and symptoms ==
Individuals with this condition usually have palmoplantar keratoderma of the thenars, hypothenars, and the foot arch. These symptoms usually start in early-late infancy which is accompanied by deafness of variable onset.

== Treatment ==
Usually, the basic forms of treatment of both deafness and palmoplantar keratoderma are combined, that is, used at the same time, to treat PKD, these include:

- Deafness: Surgery, hearing aids, cochlear implant
- Palmoplantar keratoderma: Oilments, emolients, keratolytic agents, topical retinoids

== Causes ==
This condition is caused by autosomal dominant missense mutations of the GJB2 gene, located in the long arm of chromosome 13.

== Epidemiology ==
According to OMIM, 4 families worldwide have been described with the disorder, although other sources say there are 10 families. An exact number of cases cannot be said for certain, since most case reports don't specify them.
