= Keratosis follicularis-dwarfism-cerebral atrophy syndrome =

- Other names: Dwarfism, cerebral atrophy and generalized keratosis follicularis
- Specialty: Medical genetics
- Usual onset: Birth
- Duration: Lifelong
- Risk factors: X-linked recessive disorders notoriously affect males more than they affect females
- Prevention: none
- Frequency: only 6 cases from Mexico have been reported
- Deaths: -

Keratosis follicularis-dwarfism-cerebral atrophy syndrome is a rare, presumably X-linked recessive genetic disorder characterized by keratosis follicularis, severe congenital proportionate dwarfism, and brain atrophy. Other less common findings include microcephaly, intellectual disability, alopecia, epilepsy, and inguinal hernias. It has only been described in 6 males from a 2-generation Mexican family.
