= List of storms named Bart =

The name Bart has been used for four tropical cyclones worldwide; twice each in the Western North Pacific and the South Pacific basins.

In the Western Pacific:

- Typhoon Bart (1996) (T9603, 04W, Konsing), had no impact on land
- Typhoon Bart (1999) (T9918, 24W, Oniang), the only super typhoon of the 1999 season; killed 30, injured 1314, and caused $5 billion in damage in Japan

In the South Pacific:

- Tropical Cyclone Bart (1998) (37P), minor damage recorded in French Polynesia; 10 deaths were associated with Bart, after waves from the system capsized a boat
- Tropical Cyclone Bart (2017) (15F), brought gale-force winds to the southern Cook Islands
