= Split hand split foot-nystagmus syndrome =

- Specialty: Medical genetics
- Symptoms: Lobster claw deformity of the hands and feet with nystagmus and other eye anomalies
- Complications: Usually, none
- Usual onset: Birth
- Duration: Lifelong
- Causes: Genetic mutation
- Risk factors: Having a parent with the condition
- Prevention: None
- Prognosis: Good
- Frequency: Only 10 cases from 4 families have been described in medical literature
- Deaths: -

Split hand split foot-nystagmus syndrome, also known as Karsch–Neugebauer syndrome, is a rare genetic disorder which is characterized by the absence of the central rays of the hands and feet resulting in an apparent "split hand and split foot", alongside congenital nystagmus and other eye abnormalities such as cataracts. It is inherited in an autosomal dominant manner. Only 10 cases from 4 families worldwide have been described in medical literature.
