= Acid anhydride hydrolases =

Class of hydrolase enzymes

Generic example of an acid anhydride.

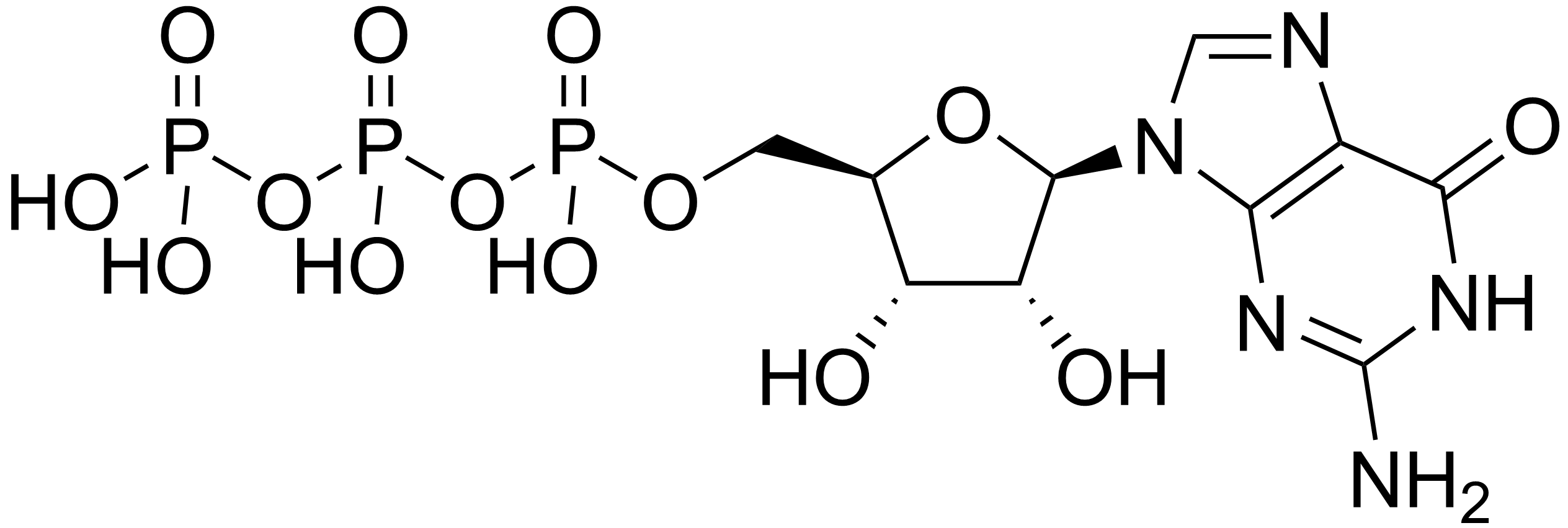
GTP

Acid anhydride hydrolases are a class of hydrolase enzymes that catalyze the hydrolysis of an acid anhydride bond. They are classified under EC number 3.6. Well known members of this class are ATPase and GTPase.

== See also ==
- List of EC numbers (EC 3)#EC 3.6: Acting on acid anhydrides
