= SLC13A3 =

Protein-coding gene in the species Homo sapiens

Identifiers
- Aliases: SLC13A3, NADC3, SDCT2, solute carrier family 13 member 3, ARLIAK
- External IDs: OMIM: 606411; MGI: 2149635; GeneCards: SLC13A3

Gene location (Human)
| Chr. | Chromosome 20 (human) |
| Band | 20q13.12 | Start | 46,557,823 bp |
| Band | 20q13.12 | End | 46,684,467 bp |

Gene location (Mouse)
| Chr. | Chromosome 2 (mouse) |
| Band | 2|2 H3 | Start | 165,246,948 bp |
| Band | 2|2 H3 | End | 165,315,150 bp |
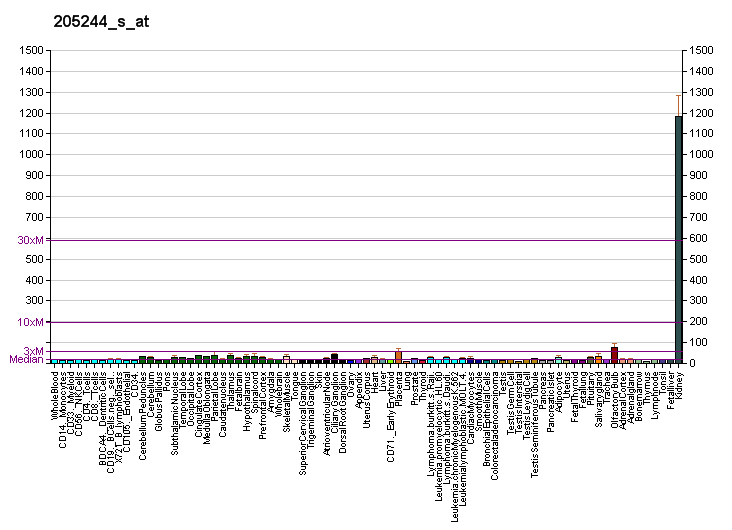

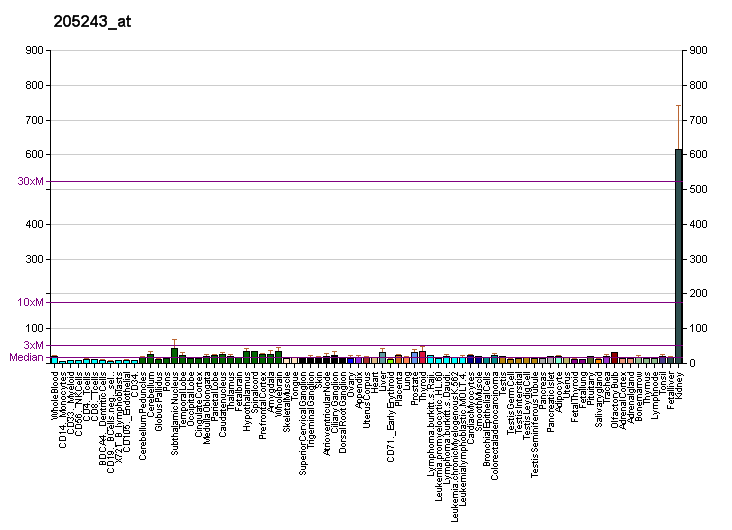
RNA expression pattern
| Bgee | Human / Mouse (ortholog); Top expressed in: kidney tubule; metanephric glomerulus; oocyte; secondary oocyte; olfactory bulb; human kidney; C1 segment; corpus callosum; right lobe of liver; placenta / Top expressed in: median eminence; retinal pigment epithelium; human kidney; right kidney; Rostral migratory stream; proximal tubule; pontine nuclei; mammillary body; olfactory tubercle; arcuate nucleus; More reference expression data |
| BioGPS | More reference expression data |
Gene ontology
| Molecular function | transporter activity; symporter activity; succinate transmembrane transporter activity; sodium:dicarboxylate symporter activity; citrate transmembrane transporter activity; high-affinity sodium:dicarboxylate symporter activity |
| Cellular component | integral component of membrane; membrane; plasma membrane; integral component of plasma membrane; extracellular exosome |
| Biological process | dicarboxylic acid transport; sodium ion transport; ion transport; succinate transmembrane transport; citrate transport; transmembrane transport; transport |
Sources:Amigo / QuickGO
Orthologs
| Databases | NCBI: entry; OMA: entry |
| Species | Human | Mouse |
| Entrez | 64849 | 114644 |
| Ensembl | ENSG00000158296 | ENSMUSG00000018459 |
| UniProt | Q8WWT9 | Q91Y63 |
| RefSeq (mRNA) | NM_022829; NM_001011554; NM_001193339; NM_001193340; NM_001193342 | NM_054055 |
| RefSeq (protein) | NP_001011554; NP_001180268; NP_001180269; NP_001180271; NP_073740 | NP_473396 |
| Location (UCSC) | Chr 20: 46.56 – 46.68 Mb | Chr 2: 165.25 – 165.32 Mb |
| PubMed search |
- Wikidata
| View/Edit Human | View/Edit Mouse |

Solute carrier family 13 member 3 also called sodium-dependent dicarboxylate transporter (NaDC3) is a protein that in humans is encoded by the SLC13A3 gene.

Mammalian sodium-dicarboxylate cotransporters transport succinate and other Krebs cycle intermediates. They fall into 2 categories based on their substrate affinity: low affinity and high affinity. Both the low- and high-affinity transporters play an important role in the handling of citrate by the kidneys. The protein encoded by this gene represents the high-affinity form. Alternatively spliced transcript variants encoding different isoforms have been found for this gene, although the full-length nature of some of them have not been characterized yet.

== See also ==
- Solute carrier family
