= Hydrolase =

Class of enzymes which use water to break a chemical bond

In biochemistry, hydrolases constitute a class of enzymes that commonly function as biochemical catalysts that use water to break a chemical bond:

$$\ce{A-B + H2O} \quad \xrightarrow[\text{ }]{hydrolase} \quad \ce{A-OH + B-H}$$

This typically results in dividing a larger molecule into smaller molecules. Some common examples of hydrolase enzymes are esterases including lipases, phosphatases, glycosidases, peptidases, and nucleosidases.

Esterases cleave ester bonds in lipids and phosphatases cleave phosphate groups off molecules. An example of crucial esterase is acetylcholine esterase, which assists in transforming the neuron impulse into the acetate group after the hydrolase breaks the acetylcholine into choline and acetic acid. Acetic acid is an important metabolite in the body and a critical intermediate for other reactions such as glycolysis. Lipases hydrolyze glycerides. Glycosidases cleave sugar molecules off carbohydrates and peptidases hydrolyze peptide bonds. Nucleosidases hydrolyze the bonds of nucleotides.

Hydrolase enzymes are important for the body because they have degradative properties. In lipids, lipases contribute to the breakdown of fats and lipoproteins and other larger molecules into smaller molecules like fatty acids and glycerol. Fatty acids and other small molecules are used for synthesis and as a source of energy.

== Nomenclature ==
Systematic names of hydrolases are formed as "substrate hydrolase." However, common names are typically in the form "substrate base". For example, a nuclease is a hydrolase that cleaves nucleic acids.

== Classification ==
Hydrolases are classified as EC 3 in the EC number classification of enzymes. Hydrolases can be further classified into several subclasses, based upon the bonds they act upon:

- EC 3.1: ester bonds (esterases: nucleases, phosphodiesterases, lipase, phosphatase)
- EC 3.2: sugars (DNA glycosylases, glycoside hydrolase)
- EC 3.3: ether bonds
- EC 3.4: peptide bonds (Proteases/peptidases)
- EC 3.5: carbon-nitrogen bonds, other than peptide bonds
- EC 3.6 acid anhydrides (acid anhydride hydrolases, including helicases and GTPase)
- EC 3.7 carbon-carbon bonds
- EC 3.8 halide bonds
- EC 3.9: phosphorus-nitrogen bonds
- EC 3.10: sulphur-nitrogen bonds
- EC 3.11: carbon-phosphorus bonds
- EC 3.12: sulfur-sulfur bonds
- EC 3.13: carbon-sulfur bonds

== Clinical considerations ==
Hydrolase secreted by Lactobacillus jensenii in the human gut stimulates the liver to secrete bile salts that aids in the digestion of food.

== Membrane-associated hydrolases ==
Many hydrolases, and especially proteases associate with biological membranes as peripheral membrane proteins or anchored through a single transmembrane helix. Some others are multi-span transmembrane proteins, for example rhomboid protease.

== Etymology and pronunciation ==
The word hydrolase (/ˈhaɪdroʊleɪs, -leɪz/) suffixes the combining form of -ase to the hydrol syllables of hydrolysis.

== See also ==
- Phosphorylase
- Serine hydrolase
- Cadmium-transporting ATPase
