= Sodium sulfate symporter =

Na_sulph_symp

Identifiers
- Symbol: Na_sulph_symp
- Pfam: PF00939
- Pfam clan: CL0182
- InterPro: IPR001898
- PROSITE: PDOC00978
- TCDB: 2.A.47
- OPM superfamily: 272
- OPM protein: 4f35
Available protein structures:
- Pfam: structures / ECOD
- PDB: RCSB PDB; PDBe; PDBj
- PDBsum: structure summary

Sodium sulfate symporters are integral membrane proteins that mediate the intake of a wide variety of molecules with the concomitant uptake of sodium ions. These sodium symporters can be grouped, on the basis of sequence and functional similarities into a number of distinct families. One of these families, also known as SLC13 transporters, consists of the following proteins:

- Mammalian sodium/sulphate cotransporter.
- Mammalian renal sodium/dicarboxylate cotransporter, which transports succinate and citrate.
- Mammalian intestinal sodium/dicarboxylate cotransporter.
- Chlamydomonas reinhardtii putative sulphur deprivation response regulator SAC1.

This family also includes a number of bacterial symporters.
