= SLC13A5 =

Protein-coding gene in humans

Identifiers
- Aliases: SLC13A5, EIEE25, NACT, mIndy, solute carrier family 13 member 5, INDY, DEE25
- External IDs: OMIM: 608305; MGI: 3037150; GeneCards: SLC13A5

Gene location (Human)
Chr.	Chromosome 17 (human)
Band	17p13.1	Start	6,684,719 bp
Band	17p13.1	End	6,713,377 bp

Gene location (Mouse)
Chr.	Chromosome 11 (mouse)
Band	11|11 B4	Start	72,132,815 bp
Band	11|11 B4	End	72,158,048 bp
RNA expression pattern
Bgee	Human / Mouse (ortholog); Top expressed in: right lobe of liver; parotid gland; tibia; nucleus accumbens; gonad; right frontal lobe; caudate nucleus; cingulate gyrus; anterior cingulate cortex; Brodmann area 9 / Top expressed in: calvaria; molar; spermatocyte; body of femur; spermatid; seminiferous tubule; stria vascularis; fossa; lumbar subsegment of spinal cord; embryo; More reference expression data
BioGPS	n/a
Gene ontology
Molecular function	transporter activity; tricarboxylic acid transmembrane transporter activity; symporter activity; succinate transmembrane transporter activity; sodium:dicarboxylate symporter activity; citrate transmembrane transporter activity
Cellular component	integral component of membrane; integral component of plasma membrane; membrane; plasma membrane
Biological process	tricarboxylic acid transport; succinate transmembrane transport; ion transport; succinate transport; sodium ion transport; transmembrane transport; tricarboxylic acid transmembrane transport; citrate transport
Sources:Amigo / QuickGO
Orthologs
Databases	NCBI: entry; OMA: entry
Species	Human	Mouse
Entrez	284111	237831
Ensembl	ENSG00000141485	ENSMUSG00000020805
UniProt	Q86YT5	Q67BT3
RefSeq (mRNA)	NM_001143838; NM_001284509; NM_001284510; NM_177550	NM_001004148; NM_001372402; NM_001372403
RefSeq (protein)	NP_001137310; NP_001271438; NP_001271439; NP_808218	NP_001004148; NP_001359331; NP_001359332
Location (UCSC)	Chr 17: 6.68 – 6.71 Mb	Chr 11: 72.13 – 72.16 Mb
PubMed search
- Wikidata
View/Edit Human	View/Edit Mouse

NaCT

Identifiers
- Symbol: SLC13A5
- PDB: 7JSJ
- UniProt: Q86YT5
Search for
- Structures: Swiss-model
- Domains: InterPro

Solute carrier family 13 (sodium-dependent citrate transporter), member 5 also known as the Na^{+}/citrate cotransporter or mIndy is a protein that in humans is encoded by the SLC13A5 gene. It is the mammalian homolog of the fly Indy gene.

== Function ==
SLC13A5 is a tricarboxylate plasma transporter with a preference for citrate.

== Clinical significance ==
In 2014, by means of exome sequencing it was determined that a genetic mutation of the gene is the cause of a rare SLC13A5 Epilepsy. Mutations in SLC13A5 cause autosomal recessive epileptic encephalopathy with seizure onset in the first days of life. Those afflicted suffer from seizures, global developmental delay, movement disorder and hypotonia.

Reduced expression of homologous genes is associated with longer lifespan in Drosophila melanogaster and Caenorhabditis elegans, and obesity protection in laboratory mice. Increased expression is associated with type 2 diabetes and non-alcoholic fatty liver disease. A sugary diet upregulates the expression of the gene, and so does Interleukin 6 signaling.

== Small molecule inhibitors ==
There are four small-molecule inhibitors to SLC13A5 that have been reported from Pfizer and a derivative from China Pharmaceutical University, Boehringer Ingelheim and the group of Elisabeth P. Carpenter from the Centre for Medicines Discovery, and Eternygen. The Pfizer molecule is an orthosteric inhibitor that locks the protein in an inward-facing state of the reaction cycle, while the mechanism of action for other inhibitors remains unknown.
