= BART superfamily =

The Bile/Arsenite/Riboflavin Transporter (BART) superfamily is a superfamily of ubiquitous transport proteins. As of early 2016, the superfamily contains seven established families. Functional data for members of all of these families are available. The seven families are in the Transporter Classification Database with the following TC numbers, names and abbreviations include:

- TC# 2.A.10 - The 2-Keto-3-Deoxygluconate Transporter (KdgT) Family
- TC# 2.A.28 - The Bile Acid:Na+ Symporter (BASS) Family
- TC# 2.A.59 - The Arsenical Resistance-3 (ACR3) Family
- TC# 2.A.69 - The Auxin Efflux Carrier (AEC) Family
- TC# 2.A.87 - The Prokaryotic Riboflavin Transporter (P-RFT) Family
- TC# 9.B.33 - The Sensor Histidine Kinase (SHK) Family
- TC# 9.B.34 - The Kinase/Phosphatase/Cyclic-GMP Synthase/Cyclic di-GMP Hydrolase (KPSH) Family

The first identified substrates for the transporters within the first 5 families are indicated by the names of the families, but all of these families transport a variety of other substrates. The majority of the protein members of the first four of these families exhibit a probable 10 transmembrane spanner (TMS) topology that arose from a tandemly duplicated 5 TMS unit. The N- and C-termini are believed to be in the cytoplasm of bacterial cells, and the same may be true of most other members as well. Members of the RFT family have a 5 TMS topology, and are homologous to each of the two repeat units in the 10 TMS proteins. The other two families [sensor histidine kinase (SHK) and kinase/phosphatase/synthetase/hydrolase (KPSH)] have a single 5 TMS unit preceded by an N-terminal TMS and followed by a hydrophilic sensor histidine kinase domain (the SHK family) or catalytic domains resembling sensor kinase, phosphatase, cyclic di-guanylate (GMP) synthetase and cyclic di-GMP hydrolase catalytic domains, as well as various non-catalytic domains (the KPSH family). Because functional data are not available for the transmembrane domains of members of the SHK and KPSH families, it is not known if these transporter-like domains retain transport activity or have evolved exclusive functions in molecular reception and signal transmission. They could serve merely to anchor the catalytic domains to the membrane. Please refer to TCDB for more details.
