= Antimonite =

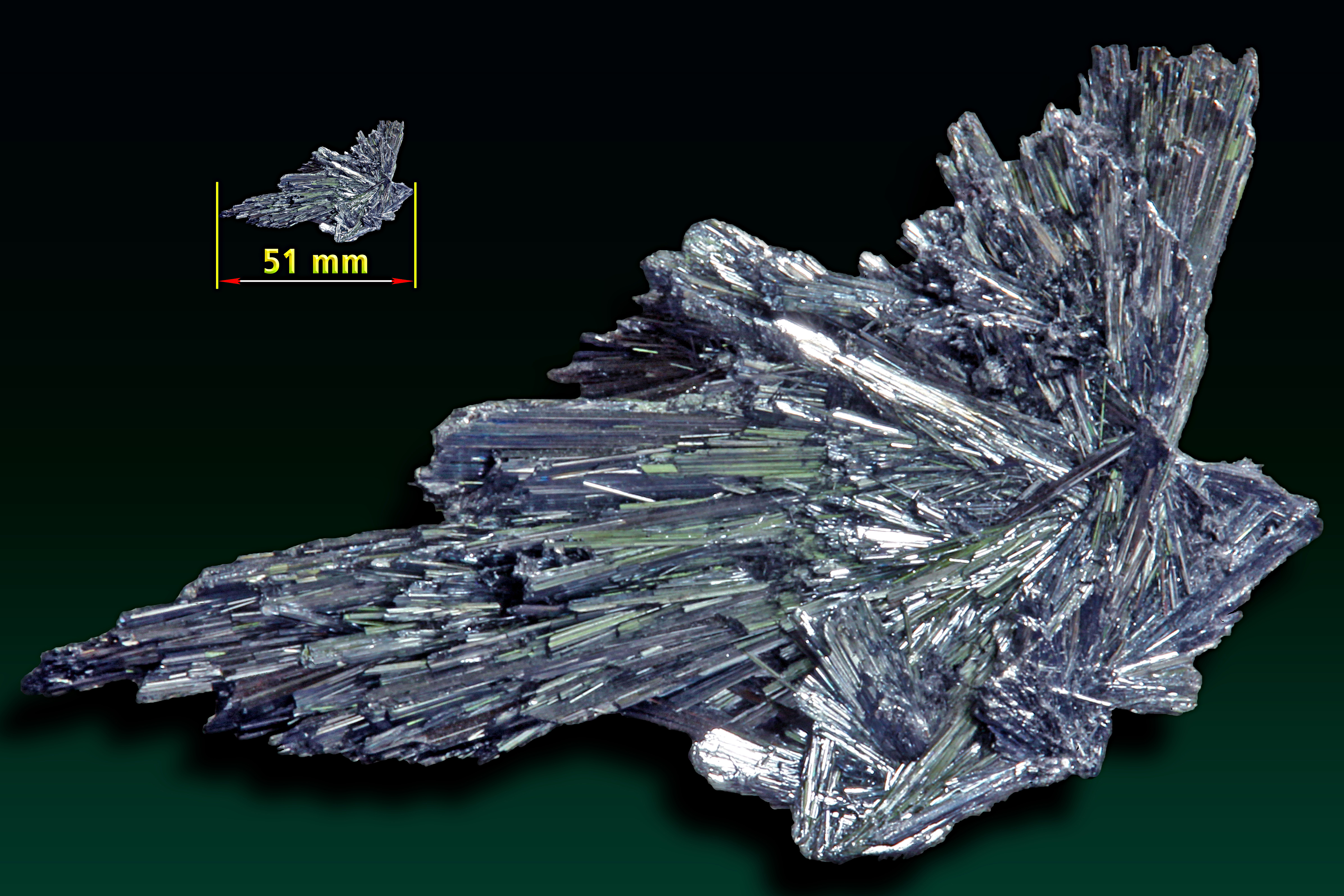
Stibnite (antimonite) - Baia Mare, Herja Mine, Romania.

In chemistry, antimonite refers to a salt of antimony(III), such as NaSb(OH)_{4} and NaSbO_{2} (meta-antimonite), which can be prepared by reacting alkali with antimony trioxide, Sb_{2}O_{3}. These are formally salts of antimonous acid, Sb(OH)_{3}, whose existence in solution is dubious. Attempts to isolate it generally form Sb_{2}O_{3}·xH_{2}O, antimony(III) oxide hydrate, which slowly transforms into Sb_{2}O_{3}.

In geology, the mineral stibnite, Sb_{2}S_{3}, is sometimes called antimonite.

Antimonites can be compared to antimonates, which contain antimony in the +5 oxidation state.
