= Ion transporter =

Transmembrane protein that moves ions across a biological membrane

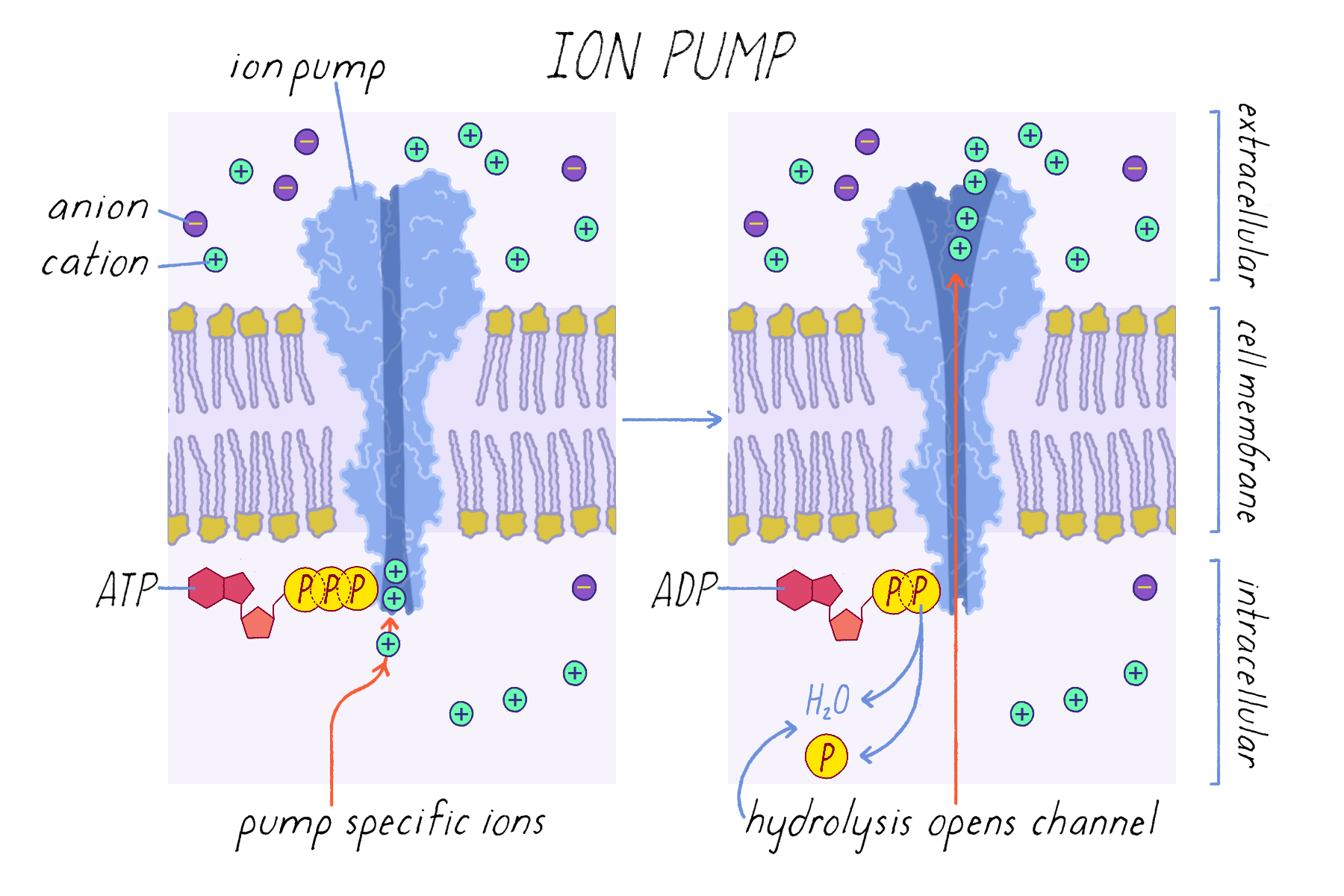
An ion pump is a membrane protein that generally moves ions across the cell membrane from areas of low concentration to areas of high concentration. Since these pumps move ions against their concentration gradients, they require energy to function, which is generally provided by the hydrolysis of ATP.

Diffusion vs. Transport

In biology, an ion transporter is a transmembrane protein that moves ions (or other small molecules) across a biological membrane to accomplish many different biological functions, including cellular communication, maintaining homeostasis, energy production, etc. There are different types of transporters including pumps, uniporters, antiporters, and symporters. Active transporters or ion pumps are transporters that convert energy from various sources—including adenosine triphosphate (ATP), sunlight, and other redox reactions—to potential energy by pumping an ion up its concentration gradient. This potential energy could then be used by secondary transporters, including ion carriers and ion channels, to drive vital cellular processes, such as ATP synthesis.

This article is focused mainly on ion transporters acting as pumps, but transporters can also function to move molecules through facilitated diffusion. Facilitated diffusion does not require ATP and allows molecules that are unable to quickly diffuse across the membrane (passive diffusion), to diffuse down their concentration gradient through these protein transporters.

Ion transporters are essential for proper cell function and thus they are highly regulated by the cell and studied by researchers using a variety of methods. Some examples of cell regulations and research methods will be given.

== Classification and disambiguation ==
Ion transporters are classified as a super family of transporters that contain 12 families of transporters. These families are part of the Transport Classification (TC) system that is used by the International Union of Biochemistry and Molecular Biology (IUBMB) and are grouped according to characteristics such as the substrates being transported, the transport mechanism, the energy source used, and also by comparing the DNA sequences making up each protein. The most important unifying factor being the charged nature of the substrate which indicates the transport of an ion and not a neutral species. Ion transporters differ significantly from ion channels. Channels are pores that run through the membrane, whereas transports are proteins that must change shape to switch which side of the membrane it is open to. Because of this, transporters are much slower at moving molecules than channels.

An electrochemical gradient or concentration gradient is a difference in concentration of a chemical molecule or ion in two separate areas. At equilibrium the concentrations of the ion in both areas will be equal, so if there is a difference in concentration the ions will seek to flow "down" the concentration gradient or from a high concentration to low concentration. Ion channels allows the specific ions that will fit into the channel to flow down their concentration gradient, equalizing the concentrations on either side of the cell membrane. Ion channels and ion transporters accomplish this via facilitated diffusion which is a type of passive transport. However, only ion transporters can also perform active transport, which involves moving ions against their concentration gradient. Using energy sources such as ATP, ion transporters are able to move ions against their concentration gradient which can then be used by secondary transporters or other proteins as a source of energy.

== Energy source ==
=== Primary transporter ===
ATPsynthase uses a chemical (proton) gradient to generate ATP

Primary transporters use energy to transport ions such as Na^{+}, K^{+}, and Ca^{2+} across a cells membrane and can create concentration gradients. This transport can use ATP as an energy source or it can be used to generate ATP through methods such as the electron transport chain in plants.

==== Active transporter ====
Active transporters use ATP to convert the energy in ATP into potential energy in the form of a concentration gradient. They use the ATP to transport an ion from a low concentration to a higher concentration. Examples of proteins that use ATP are P-type ATPases that transfer Na^{+}, K^{+}, and Ca^{2+} ions by phosphorylation, A-type ATPases that transfer anions, and ABC transporters (ATP binding cassette transporters) that transport a broad set of molecules. Examples of the P-type ATPase include Na^{+}/K^{+}-ATPase that is regulated by Janus Kinase-2 as well as Ca^{2+} ATPase which exhibits sensitivity to ADP and ATP concentrations. P-glycoprotein is an example of an ABC transport binding protein in the human body.

==== ATP producing transporter ====
ATP producing transporters run in the opposite direction of ATP Utilizing transporters. These proteins transport ions from high to low concentration with the gradient but in the process ATP is formed. Potential energy in the form of the concentration gradient is used to generate ATP. In animals, this ATP synthesis takes place in the mitochondria using F- type ATPase otherwise known as ATP synthase. This process utilizes the electron transport chain in a process called oxidative phosphorylation. V-type ATPase serves the opposite function as F-type ATPase and is used in plants to hydrolyze ATP to create a proton gradient. Examples of this are lysosomes that use V-type ATPase to acidify vesicles or plant vacuoles during the process of photosynthesis in the chloroplasts. This process can be regulated through various methods such as pH.

=== Secondary transporter ===
Na^{+} Glu Symporter

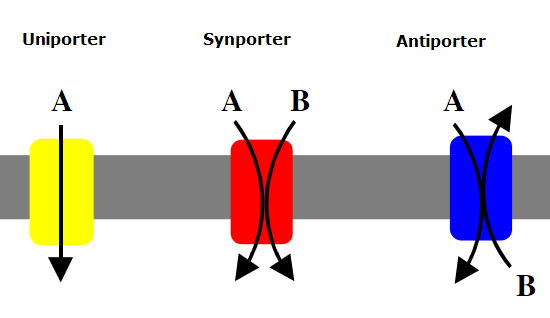

Secondary transporters also transport ions (or small molecules) against the concentration gradient – from low concentration to high concentration - but unlike primary transporters which use ATP to create a concentration gradient, secondary transporters use the potential energy from the concentration gradient created by the primary transporters to transport ions. For example, the sodium-dependent glucose transporter found in the small intestine and kidney use the sodium gradient created in the cell by the sodium potassium pump (as mentioned above) to help carry glucose into the cell. This happens as sodium flows down its concentration gradient which provides enough energy to push glucose up its concentration gradient back into the cell. This is important in the small intestine and the kidney to prevent them from losing glucose. Symporters such as the sodium-glucose symporter transport an ion with its concentration gradient, and they couple the transport of a second molecule in the same direction. Antiporters also use the concentration gradient of one molecule to move another up its concentration gradient but the coupled molecule is transported in the opposite direction.

== Regulation ==
Ion transporters can be regulated in a variety of different ways such as phosphorylation, allosteric inhibition or activation, and sensitivity to ion concentration. Using protein kinases to add a phosphate group or phosphatases to dephosphorylate the protein can change the activity of the transporter. Whether the protein is activated or inhibited with the addition of the phosphate group depends on the specific protein. With allosteric inhibition, the regulatory ligand can bind into the regulatory site and either inhibit or activate the transporter. Ion transporters can also be regulated by the concentration of an ion (not necessarily the ion it transfers) in solution. For example, the electron transport chain is regulated by the presence of H^{+} ions (pH) in solution.

== Techniques for studying ion transporters ==
=== Patch clamp ===
A patch clamp is an electrophysiology technique used to study channels and transporters in cells by tracking the current that run through them. This technique was perfected by Hodgkin and Huxley before the existence of channels and transporters was known. Besides its groundbreaking work early on patch clamping legacy continues on and is commonly used by researchers still to study ion transporters and how environments and ligands effects the function of the transporter.

=== X-ray crystallography ===
X-ray crystallography is a tool that allows the structure of proteins to be visualized, however, it is only a snapshot of one protein conformation. The structure of transport proteins allows researchers to further understand how and what the transporter does to move molecules across the membrane.

=== Fluorescence recovery after photobleaching ===
Fluorescence recovery after photobleaching (FRAP) is a technique used to track diffusion of lipids or proteins in a membrane. This technique is used to better understand transporters mobility in the cell and its interactions with lipid domains and lipid rafts in the cell membrane.

=== Förster resonance energy transfer ===
Förster resonance energy transfer (FRET) is a technique that uses fluorescence to track how close two proteins are to each other. This has been used in studying transporters to see how they interact with other cellular proteins.

== Table of ion transporters ==
Ion Transporters
Neurotransmitter transporter
Glutamate transporter
Monoamine transporter
GABA transporters
Glycine transporters
Adenosine transporters
Plasma membrane Ca^{2+} ATPase
Sodium-calcium exchanger
Sodium-chloride symporter

== See also ==
- Active transport
- Ion transport number
- Ion transporter superfamily
- Membrane transport protein
- Transport protein
