= Transporter Classification Database =

Classification of membrane proteins including ion channels

The Transporter Classification Database (or TCDB) is an International Union of Biochemistry and Molecular Biology (IUBMB)-approved classification system for membrane transport proteins, including ion channels.

== Classification ==
The upper level of classification and a few examples of proteins with known 3D structure:

=== 1. Channels and pores ===
==== 1.A α-type channels ====
- 1.A.1 Voltage-gated ion channel superfamily
- 1.A.2 Inward-rectifier K^{+} channel family
- 1.A.3 Ryanodine-inositol-1,4,5-trisphosphate receptor Ca^{2+} channel family
- 1.A.4 Transient receptor potential Ca^{2+} channel family
- 1.A.5 Polycystin cation channel family
- 1.A.6 Epithelial Na^{+} channel family
- 1.A.7 ATP-gated P2X receptor cation channel family
- 1.A.8 Major intrinsic protein superfamily
- 1.A.9 Neurotransmitter receptor, Cys loop, ligand-gated ion channel family
- 1.A.10 Glutamate-gated ion channel family of neurotransmitter receptors
- 1.A.11 Ammonium channel transporter family
- 1.A.12 Intracellular chloride channel family
- 1.A.13 Epithelial chloride channel family
- 1.A.14 Testis-enhanced gene transfer family
- 1.A.15 Nonselective cation channel-2 family
- 1.A.16 Formate-nitrite transporter family
- 1.A.17 Calcium-dependent chloride channel family
- 1.A.18 Chloroplast envelope anion-channel-forming Tic110 family
- 1.A.19 Type A influenza virus matrix-2 channel family
- 1.A.20 BCL2/Adenovirus E1B-interacting protein 3 family
- 1.A.21 Bcl-2 family
- 1.A.22 Large-conductance mechanosensitive ion channel
- 1.A.23 Small-conductance mechanosensitive ion channel
- 1.A.24 Gap-junction-forming connexin family
- 1.A.25 Gap-junction-forming innexin family
- 1.A.26 Mg^{2+} transporter-E family
- 1.A.27 Phospholemman family
- 1.A.28 Urea transporter family
- 1.A.29 Urea/amide channel family
- 1.A.30 H^{+}- or Na^{+}-translocating bacterial MotAB flagellar motor/ExbBD outer-membrane transport energizer superfamily
- 1.A.31 Annexin family
- 1.A.32 Type B influenza virus NB channel family
- 1.A.33 Cation-channel-forming heat shock protein 70 family
- 1.A.34 Bacillus gap junction-like channel-forming complex family
- 1.A.35 CorA metal ion transporter family
- 1.A.36 Intracellular chloride channel family
- 1.A.37 CD20 Ca^{2+} channel family
- 1.A.38 Golgi pH regulator family
- 1.A.39 Type C influenza virus CM2 channel family
- 1.A.40 Human immunodeficiency virus type I Vpu channel family
- 1.A.41 Avian reovirus p10 Vvroporin family
- 1.A.42 HIV viral protein R family
- 1.A.43 Camphor resistance or fluoride exporter family
- 1.A.44 Pore-forming tail Tip pb2 protein of phage T5 family
- 1.A.45 Phage P22 injectisome family
- 1.A.46 Anion channel-forming bestrophin family
- 1.A.47 Nucleotide-sensitive anion-selective channel, ICln family
- 1.A.48 Anion channel Tweety family
- 1.A.49 Human coronavirus ns12.9 viroporin family
- 1.A.50 Phospholamban (Ca^{2+}-channel and Ca^{2+}-ATPase regulator) family
- 1.A.51 The Voltage-gated Proton Channel (VPC) Family
- 1.A.52 The Ca^{2+} Release-activated Ca^{2+} (CRAC) Channel (CRAC-C) Family
- 1.A.53 The Hepatitis C Virus P7 Viroporin Cation-selective Channel (HCV-P7) Family
- 1.A.54 The Presenilin ER Ca^{2+} Leak Channel (Presenilin) Family
- 1.A.55 The Synaptic Vesicle-Associated Ca^{2+} Channel, Flower (Flower) Family
- 1.A.56 The Copper Transporter (Ctr) Family
- 1.A.57 The Human SARS Coronavirus Viroporin (SARS-VP)
- 1.A.58 The Type B Influenza Virus Matrix Protein 2 (BM2-C) Family
- 1.A.59 The Bursal Disease Virus Pore-Forming Peptide, Pep46 (Pep46) Family
- 1.A.60 The Mammalian Reovirus Pre-forming Peptide, Mu-1 (Mu-1) Family
- 1.A.61 The Insect Nodavirus Channel-forming Chain F (Gamma-Peptide) Family
- 1.A.62 The Homotrimeric Cation Channel (TRIC) Family
- 1.A.63 The Ignicoccus Outer Membrane α-helical Porin (I-OMP Family
- 1.A.64 The Plasmolipin (Plasmolipin) Family
- 1.A.65 The Coronavirus Viroporin E Protein (Viroporin E) Family
- 1.A.66 The Pardaxin (Pardaxin) Family
- 1.A.67 The Membrane Mg^{2+} Transporter (MMgT) Family
- 1.A.68 The Viral Small Hydrophobic Viroporin (V-SH) Family
- 1.A.69 The Heteromeric Odorant Receptor Channel (HORC) Family
- 1.A.70 The Molecule Against Microbes A (MamA) Family
- 1.A.71 The Brain Acid-soluble Protein Channel (BASP1 Channel) Family
- 1.A.72 The Mer Superfamily
- 1.A.73 The Colicin Lysis Protein (CLP) Family
- 1.A.74 The Mitsugumin 23 (MG23) Family
- 1.A.75 The Mechanical Nociceptor, Piezo (Piezo) Family
- 1.A.76 The Magnesium Transporter1 (MagT1) Family
- 1.A.77 The Mg^{2+}/Ca^{2+} Uniporter (MCU) Family
- 1.A.78 The K^{+}-selective Channel in Endosomes and Lysosomes (KEL) Family
- 1.A.79 The Cholesterol Uptake Protein (ChUP) or Double Stranded RNA Uptake Family
- 1.A.80 The NS4a Viroporin (NS4a) Family
- 1.A.81 The Low Affinity Ca^{2+} Channel (LACC) Family
- 1.A.82 The Hair Cell Mechanotransduction Channel (HCMC) Family
- 1.A.83 The SV40 Virus Viroporin VP2 (SV40 VP2) Family
- 1.A.84 The Calcium Homeostasis Modulator Ca^{2+} Channel (CALHM-C) Family
- 1.A.85 The Poliovirus 2B Viroporin (2B Viroporin) Family
- 1.A.86 The Human Papilloma Virus type 16 (HPV16) L2 Viroporin (L2 Viroporin) Family
- 1.A.87 The Mechanosensitive Calcium Channel (MCA) Family
- 1.A.88 The Fungal Potassium Channel (F-Kch) Family
- 1.A.89 The Human Coronavirus 229E Viroporin (229E Viroporin) Family
- 1.A.90 The Human Metapneumovirus (HMPV) Viroporin (HMPV-Viroporin) Family
- 1.A.91 The Cytoadherence-linked Asexual Protein 3.2 of Plasmodium falciparum (Clag3) Family
- 1.A.92 The Reovirus Viroporin VP10 (RVP10) Family
- 1.A.93 The Bluetongue Virus Non-Structural Protein 3 Viroporin (NS3) Family
- 1.A.94 The Rotavirus Non-structural Glycoprotein 4 Viroporin (NSP4) Family
- 1.A.95 The Ephemerovirus Viroporin (EVVP) Family
- 1.A.96 The Human Polyoma Virus Viroporin (PVVP) Family
- 1.A.97 The Human Papillomavirus type 16 E5 Viroporin (HPV-E5) Family
- 1.A.98 Human T-Lymphotropic Virus 1 P13 protein (HTLV1-P13) Family
- 1.A.99 The Infectious Bronchitis Virus Envelope Small Membrane Protein E (IBV-E) Family
- 1.A.100 The Rhabdoviridae Putative Viroporin, U5 (RV-U5) Family
- 1.A.101 The Peroxisomal Pore-forming Pex11 (Pex11) Family
- 1.A.102 Influenza A viroporin PB1-F2 (PB1-F2) Family
- 1.A.103 The Simian Virus 5 (Parainfluenza Virus 5) SH (SV5-SH) Family
- 1.A.104 The Proposed Flagellar Biosynthesis Na^{+} Channel, FlaH (FlaH) Family
- 1.A.105 The Mixed Lineage Kinase Domain-like (MLKL) Family
- 1.A.106 The Calcium Load-activated Calcium Channel (CLAC) Family
- 1.A.107 The Pore-forming Globin (Globin) Family

==== 1.B. β-Barrel porins and other outer membrane proteins ====
- 1.B.1 General bacterial porin family
- 1.B.2 Chlamydial porin (CP) family
- 1.B.3 Sugar porin (SP) family
- 1.B.4 Brucella-Rhizobium porin (BRP) family
- 1.B.5 Pseudomonas OprP porin (POP) family
- 1.B.6 OmpA-OmpF porin (OOP) family
- 1.B.7 Rhodobacter PorCa porin (RPP) family
- 1.B.8 Mitochondrial and plastid porin (MPP) family
- 1.B.9 FadL outer membrane protein (FadL) family
- 1.B.10 Nucleoside-specific channel-forming outer membrane porin (Tsx) family
- 1.B.11 Outer membrane fimbrial usher porin (FUP) family
- 1.B.12 Autotransporter-1 (AT-1) family
- 1.B.13 Alginate export porin (AEP) family
- 1.B.14 Outer membrane receptor (OMR) family
- 1.B.15 Raffinose porin (RafY) family
- 1.B.16 Short chain amide and urea porin (SAP) family
- 1.B.17 Outer membrane factor (OMF) family
- 1.B.18 Outer membrane auxiliary (OMA) protein family
- 1.B.19 Glucose-selective OprB porin (OprB) family
- 1.B.20 Two-partner secretion (TPS) family
- 1.B.21 OmpG porin (OmpG) family
- 1.B.22 Outer bacterial membrane secretin (secretin) family
- 1.B.23 Cyanobacterial porin (CBP) family
- 1.B.24 Mycobacterial porin
- 1.B.25 Outer membrane porin (Opr) family
- 1.B.26 Cyclodextrin porin (CDP) family
- 1.B.31 Campylobacter jejuni major outer membrane porin (MomP) family
- 1.B.32 Fusobacterial outer membrane porin (FomP) family
- 1.B.33 Outer membrane protein insertion porin (Bam complex) (OmpIP) family
- 1.B.34 Corynebacterial porins
- 1.B.35 Oligogalacturonate-specific porin (KdgM) family
- 1.B.39 Bacterial porin, OmpW (OmpW) family
- 1.B.42 Outer membrane lipopolysaccharide export porin (LPS-EP) family
- 1.B.43 Coxiella porin P1 (CPP1) family
- 1.B.44 Probable protein translocating porphyromonas gingivalis porin (PorT) family
- 1.B.49 Anaplasma P44 (A-P44) porin family
- 1.B.48 Curli-like transporters
- 1.B.54 Intimin/Invasin (Int/Inv) or Autotransporter-3 family
- 1.B.55 Poly-acetyl-D-glucosamine porin (PgaA) family
- 1.B.57 Legionella major-outer membrane protein (LM-OMP) family
- 1.B.60 Omp50 porin (Omp50 Porin) family
- 1.B.61 Delta-proteobacterial porin (Delta-porin) family
- 1.B.62 Putative bacterial porin (PBP) family
- 1.B.66 Putative beta-barrel porin-2 (BBP2) family
- 1.B.67 Putative beta barrel porin-4 (BBP4) family
- 1.B.68 Putative beta barrel porin-5 (BBP5) superfamily
- 1.B.70 Outer membrane channel (OMC) family
- 1.B.71 Proteobacterial/verrucomicrobial porin (PVP) family
- 1.B.72 Protochlamydial outer membrane porin (PomS/T) family
- 1.B.73 Capsule biogenesis/assembly (CBA) family
- 1.B.78 DUF3374 electron transport-associated porin (ETPorin) family

==== 1.C Pore-forming toxins (proteins and peptides) ====
- 1.C.3 α-Hemolysin (αHL) family
- 1.C.4 Aerolysin family
- 1.C.5 ε-toxin family
- 1.C.11 RTX-toxin superfamily
- 1.C.12 Membrane attack complex/perforin superfamily
- 1.C.13 Leukocidin family
- 1.C.14 Cytohemolysin (CHL) family
- 1.C.39 Thiol-activated cholesterol-dependent cytolysin family
- 1.C.43 Lysenin family
- 1.C.56 Pseudomonas syringae HrpZ cation channel family
- 1.C.57 Clostridial cytotoxin family
- 1.C.58 The Microcin E492/C24 (Microcin E492) Family
- 1.C.74 Snake cytotoxin (SCT) family
- 1.C.97 Pleurotolysin pore-forming family

==== 1.D Non-ribosomally synthesized channels ====
- 1.D.1 The Gramicidin A Channel Family
- 1.D.2 The Channel-forming Syringomycin Family
- 1.D.3 The Channel-Forming Syringopeptin Family
- 1.D.4 The Tolaasin Channel-forming Family
- 1.D.5 The Alamethicin or Peptaibol Antibiotic Channel-forming Family
- 1.D.6 The Complexed Poly 3-Hydroxybutyrate Ca^{2+} Channel (cPHB-CC) Family
- 1.D.7 The Beticolin Family
- 1.D.8 The Saponin Family
- 1.D.9 The Polyglutamine Ion Channel (PG-IC) Family
- 1.D.10 The Ceramide-forming Channel Family
- 1.D.11 The Surfactin Family
- 1.D.12 The Beauvericin (Beauvericin) Family
- 1.D.13 DNA-delivery Amphipathic Peptide Antibiotics (DAPA)
- 1.D.14 The Synthetic Leu/Ser Amphipathic Channel-forming Peptide (l/S-SCP) Family
- 1.D.15 The Daptomycin (Daptomycin) Family
- 1.D.16 The Synthetic Amphipathic Pore-forming Heptapeptide (SAPH) Family
- 1.D.17 Combinatorially-designed, Pore-forming, β-sheet Peptide Family
- 1.D.18 The Pore-forming Guanosine-Bile Acid Conjugate Family
- 1.D.19 Ca^{2+} Channel-forming Drug, Digitoxin Family
- 1.D.20 The Pore-forming Polyene Macrolide Antibiotic/fungal Agent (PMAA) Family
- 1.D.21 The Lipid Nanopore (LipNP) Family
- 1.D.22 The Proton-Translocating Carotenoid Pigment, Zeaxanthin Family
- 1.D.23 Phenylene Ethynylene Pore-forming Antimicrobial (PEPA) Family
- 1.D.24 The Marine Sponge Polytheonamide B (pTB) Family
- 1.D.25 The Arylamine Foldamer (AAF) Family
- 1.D.26 The Dihydrodehydrodiconiferyl alcohol 9'-O-β-D-glucoside (DDDC9G) Family
- 1.D.27 The Thiourea isosteres Family
- 1.D.28 The Lipopeptaibol Family
- 1.D.29 The Macrocyclic Oligocholate Family
- 1.D.30 The Artificial Hydrazide-appended pillar[5]arene Channels (HAPA-C) Family
- 1.D.31 The Amphotericin B Family
- 1.D.32 The Pore-forming Novicidin Family
- 1.D.33 The Channel-forming Polytheonamide B Family
- 1.D.34 The Channel-forming Oligoester Bolaamphiphiles
- 1.D.35 The Pore-forming cyclic Lipodepsipeptide Family
- 1.D.36 The Oligobornene Ion Channel Family
- 1.D.37 The Hibicuslide C Family
- 1.D.38 The Cyclic Peptide Nanotube (cPepNT) Family
- 1.D.39 The Light-controlled Azobenzene-based Amphiphilic Molecular Ion Channel (AAM-IC) Family
- 1.D.40 The Protein-induced Lipid Toroidal Pore Family
- 1.D.41 The Sprotetonate-type Ionophore (Spirohexanolide) Family
- 1.D.42 The Phe-Arg Tripeptide-Pillar[5]Arene Channel (TPPA-C) Family
- 1.D.43 The Triazole-tailored Guanosine Dinucleoside Channel (TT-GDN-C) Family
- 1.D.44 The Synthetic Ion Channel with Redox-active Ferrocene (ICRF) Family
- 1.D.45 The Sonoporation and Electroporation Membrane Pore (SEMP) Family
- 1.D.46 The DNA Nanopore (DnaNP) Family
- 1.D.47 The Pore-forming Synthetic Cyclic Peptide (PSCP) Family
- 1.D.48 The Pore-forming Syringomycin E Family
- 1.D.49 The Transmembrane Carotenoid Radical Channel (CRC) Family
- 1.D.50 The Amphiphilic bis-Catechol Anion Transporter (AC-AT) Family
- 1.D.51 The Protein Nanopore (ProNP) Family
- 1.D.52 The Aromatic Oligoamide Macrocycle Nanopore (OmnNP) Family
- 1.D.53 The alpha, gamma-Peptide Nanotube (a,gPepNT) Family
- 1.D.54 The potassium-selective Hexyl-Benzoureido-15-Crown-5-Ether Ion Channel (HBEC) Family
- 1.D.55 The Porphyrin-based Nanopore (PorNP) Family
- 1.D.56 The Alpha-Aminoisobutyrate (Aib) Oligomeric Nanopore (AibNP) Family
- 1.D.57 The Lipid Electro-Pore (LEP) Family
- 1.D.58 The Anion Transporting Prodigiosene (Prodigiosene) Family
- 1.D.59 The Anion Transporting Perenosin (Perenosin) Family
- 1.D.60 The Alpha,Gamma-Cyclic Peptide (AGCP) Family
- 1.D.61 The Anionophoric 2,6-Bis(Benzimidazol-2-yl)Pyridine (ABBP) Family
- 1.D.62 The Bis-Triazolyl DiGuanosine Derivative Channel-forming (TDG) Family
- 1.D.63 The Peptide-based Nanopore (PepNP) Family
- 1.D.64 The Carbon Nanotube (CarNT) Family
- 1.D.65 The Pore-forming Amphidinol (Amphidinol) Family
- 1.D.66 The Helical Macromolecule Nanopore (HmmNP) Family
- 1.D.67 The Crown Ether-modified Helical Peptide Ion Channel (CEHP) Family
- 1.D.68 The Pore-forming Pleuronic Block Polymer (PPBP) Family
- 1.D.69 The Conical Nanopore (ConNP) Family
- 1.D.70 The Metallic (Au/Ag/Pt/graphene) Nanopore (MetNP) Family
- 1.D.71 The Synthetic TP359 Peptide (TP359) Family
- 1.D.72 The Chloride Carrier Triazine-based Tripodal Receptor (CCTTR) Family
- 1.D.73 The Mesoporous Silica Nanopore (SilNP) Family
- 1.D.74 The Stimulus-responsive Synthetic Rigid p-Octiphenyl Stave Pore (SSROP) Family

==== 1.F Vesicle fusion pores ====
- 1.F.1 The Synaptosomal Vesicle Fusion Pore (SVF-Pore) Family
- 1.F.2 The Octameric Exocyst (Exocyst) Family

==== 1.G Viral fusion pores ====
- 1.G.1 The Viral Pore-forming Membrane Fusion Protein-1 (VMFP1) Family
- 1.G.2 The Viral Pore-forming Membrane Fusion Protein-2 (VMFP2) Family
- 1.G.3 The Viral Pore-forming Membrane Fusion Protein-3 (VMFP3) Family
- 1.G.4 The Viral Pore-forming Membrane Fusion Protein-4 (VMFP4) Family
- 1.G.5 The Viral Pore-forming Membrane Fusion Protein-5 (VMFP5) Family
- 1.G.6 The Hepadnaviral S Fusion Protein (HBV-S Protein) Family
- 1.G.7 The Reovirus FAST Fusion Protein (R-FAST) Family
- 1.G.8 The Arenavirus Fusion Protein (AV-FP) Family
- 1.G.9 The Syncytin (Syncytin) Family
- 1.G.10 The Herpes Simplex Virus Membrane Fusion Complex (HSV-MFC) Family
- 1.G.11 Poxvirus Cell Entry Protein Complex (PEP-C) Family
- 1.G.12 The Avian Leukosis Virus gp95 Fusion Protein (ALV-gp95) Family
- 1.G.13 The Orthoreovirus Fusion-associated Small Transmembrane (FAST) Family
- 1.G.14 The Influenza Virus Hemagglutinin/Fusion Pore-forming Protein (Influenza-H/FPP) Family
- 1.G.15 The Autographa californica Nuclear Polyhedrosis Virus Major Envelope Glycoprotein GP64 (GP64) Family
- 1.G.16 The Human Immunodeficiency Virus Type 1 (HIV-1) Fusion Peptide (HIV-FP) Family
- 1.G.17 The Bovine Leukemia Virus Envelop Glycoprotein (BLV-Env) Family
- 1.G.18 The SARS-CoV Fusion Peptide in the Spike Glycoprotein Precursor (SARS-FP) Family
- 1.G.19 The Rotavirus Pore-forming Membrane Fusion Complex (Rotavirus MFC) Family
- 1.G.20 The Hantavirus Gc Envelope Fusion Glycoprotein (Gc-EFG) Family
- 1.G.21 The Epstein Barr Virus (Human Herpes Virus 4) Gp42 (Gp42) Family
- 1.G.22 The Cytomegalovirus (Human Herpesvirus 5) Glycoprotein gO (gO) Family

==== 1.H Paracellular channels ====
- 1.H.1 The Claudin Tight Junction (Claudin1) Family
- 1.H.2 The Invertebrate PMP22-Claudin (Claudin2) Family

==== 1.I Membrane-bound channels ====
- 1.I.1 Nuclear pore complex family, including karyopherins
- 1.I.2 Plant plasmodesmata family

=== 2. Electrochemical potential-driven transporters ===
==== 2.A Porters (uniporters, symporters, antiporters) ====
- 2.A.1 Major Facilitator superfamily (MFS), see also Lactose permease, Phosphate permease and Glucose transporter
- 2.A.2 The Glycoside-Pentoside-Hexuronide (GPH):Cation Symporter Family
- 2.A.3 The Amino Acid-Polyamine-Organocation (APC) Family
- 2.A.4 Cation diffusion facilitator (CDF) Family
- 2.A.5 Zinc (Zn^{2+})-Iron (Fe^{2+}) Permease Family
- 2.A.6 Resistance-Nodulation-Cell Division Superfamily, see also SecDF protein-export membrane protein
- 2.A.7 The Drug/Metabolite Transporter (DMT) Superfamily
- 2.A.8 The Gluconate:H^{+} Symporter (GntP) Family
- 2.A.9 The Membrane Protein Insertase (YidC/Alb3/Oxa1) Family
- 2.A.10 The 2-Keto-3-Deoxygluconate Transporter (KdgT) Family
- 2.A.11 The Citrate-Mg^{2+}:H^{+} (CitM) Citrate-Ca^{2+}:H^{+} (CitH) Symporter (CitMHS) Family
- 2.A.12 ATP:ADP Antiporter Family
- 2.A.13 The C4-Dicarboxylate Uptake (Dcu) Family
- 2.A.14 Lactate Permease Family
- 2.A.15 The Betaine/Carnitine/Choline Transporter (BCCT) Family
- 2.A.16 Tellurite-resistance/Dicarboxylate Transporter Family
- 2.A.17 Proton-dependent Oligopeptide Transporter Family
- 2.A.18 The Amino Acid/Auxin Permease (AAAP) Family
- 2.A.19 The Ca^{2+}:Cation Antiporter (CaCA) Family
- 2.A.20 The Inorganic Phosphate Transporter (PiT) Family
- 2.A.21 Solute:Sodium Symporter Family
- 2.A.22 The Neurotransmitter:Sodium Symporter Family
- 2.A.23 The Dicarboxylate/Amino Acid:Cation (Na^{+} or H^{+}) Symporter (DAACS) Family
- 2.A.24 The 2-Hydroxycarboxylate Transporter (2-HCT) Family
- 2.A.25 Alanine or Glycine:Cation Symporter (AGCS) Family
- 2.A.26 The Branched Chain Amino Acid:Cation Symporter (LIVCS) Family
- 2.A.27 The Glutamate:Na^{+} Symporter (ESS) Family
- 2.A.28 Bile Acid:Na^{+} Symporter Family
- 2.A.29 Mitochondrial carrier Family
- 2.A.30 Cation-Chloride Cotransporter (CCC) Family
- 2.A.31 Anion Exchanger Family
- 2.A.32 The Silicon Transporter (Sit) Family
- 2.A.33 NhaA Na^{+}:H^{+} Antiporter (NhaA) Family
- 2.A.34 The NhaB Na^{+}:H^{+} Antiporter (NhaB) Family
- 2.A.35 The NhaC Na^{+}:H^{+} Antiporter (NhaC) Family
- 2.A.36 Monovalent Cation:Proton Antiporter-1 (CPA1) Family
- 2.A.37 Monovalent Cation:Proton Antiporter-2 (CPA2) Family
- 2.A.38 K^{+} Transporter (Trk) Family
- 2.A.39 Nucleobase:Cation Symporter-1 (NCS1) Family
- 2.A.40 Nucleobase:Cation Symporter-2 (NCS2) Family
- 2.A.41 The Concentrative Nucleoside Transporter (CNT) Family
- 2.A.42 The Hydroxy/Aromatic Amino Acid Permease (HAAAP) Family
- 2.A.43 The Lysosomal Cystine Transporter (LCT) Family
- 2.A.45 Arsenite-Antimonite Efflux Family
- 2.A.46 The Benzoate:H^{+} Symporter (BenE) Family
- 2.A.47 Divalent Anion:Na^{+} Symporter (DASS) Family
- 2.A.48 The Reduced Folate Carrier (RFC) Family
- 2.A.49 Chloride Carrier/Channel (ClC) Family
- 2.A.50 The Glycerol Uptake (GUP) Family
- 2.A.51 The Chromate Ion Transporter (CHR) Family
- 2.A.52 The Ni^{2+}-Co^{2+} Transporter (NiCoT) Family
- 2.A.53 Sulfate permease (SulP) Family
- 2.A.54 The Mitochondrial Tricarboxylate Carrier (MTC) Family
- 2.A.55 The Metal Ion (Mn^{2+}-iron) Transporter (Nramp) Family
- 2.A.56 The Tripartite ATP-independent Periplasmic Transporter (TRAP-T) Family
- 2.A.57 The Equilibrative Nucleoside Transporter (ENT) Family
- 2.A.58 The Phosphate:Na^{+} Symporter (PNaS) Family
- 2.A.59 The Arsenical Resistance-3 (ACR3) Family
- 2.A.60 Organo Anion Transporter (OAT) Family
- 2.A.61 The C4-dicarboxylate Uptake C (DcuC) Family
- 2.A.62 The NhaD Na^{+}:H^{+} Antiporter (NhaD) Family
- 2.A.63 The Monovalent Cation (K^{+} or Na^{+}):Proton Antiporter-3 (CPA3) Family
- 2.A.64 Twin Arginine Targeting (Tat) Family
- 2.A.65 The Bilirubin Transporter (BRT) Family
- 2.A.66 The Multidrug/Oligosaccharidyl-lipid/Polysaccharide (MOP) Flippase Superfamily
- 2.A.67 The Oligopeptide Transporter (OPT) Family
- 2.A.68 The p-Aminobenzoyl-glutamate Transporter (AbgT) Family
- 2.A.69 The Auxin Efflux Carrier (AEC) Family
- 2.A.70 The Malonate:Na^{+} Symporter (MSS) Family
- 2.A.71 The Folate-Biopterin Transporter (FBT) Family
- 2.A.72 The K^{+} Uptake Permease (KUP) Family
- 2.A.73 The Short Chain Fatty Acid Uptake (AtoE) Family
- 2.A.74 The 4 TMS Multidrug Endosomal Transporter (MET) Family
- 2.A.75 The L-Lysine Exporter (LysE) Family
- 2.A.76 The Resistance to Homoserine/Threonine (RhtB) Family
- 2.A.77 The Cadmium Resistance (CadD) Family
- 2.A.78 The Branched Chain Amino Acid Exporter (LIV-E) Family
- 2.A.79 The Threonine/Serine Exporter (ThrE) Family
- 2.A.80 The Tricarboxylate Transporter (TTT) Family
- 2.A.81 The Aspartate:Alanine Exchanger (AAEx) Family
- 2.A.82 The Organic Solute Transporter (OST) Family
- 2.A.83 The Na^{+}-dependent Bicarbonate Transporter (SBT) Family
- 2.A.84 The Chloroplast Maltose Exporter (MEX) Family
- 2.A.85 The Aromatic Acid Exporter (ArAE) Family
- 2.A.86 The Autoinducer-2 Exporter (AI-2E) Family (Formerly the PerM Family, TC #9.B.22)
- 2.A.87 The Prokaryotic Riboflavin Transporter (P-RFT) Family
- 2.A.88 Vitamin Uptake Transporter (VUT or ECF) Family
- 2.A.89 The Vacuolar Iron Transporter (VIT) Family
- 2.A.90 Vitamin A Receptor/Transporter (STRA6) Family
- 2.A.91 Mitochondrial tRNA Import Complex (M-RIC) (Formerly 9.C.8)
- 2.A.92 The Choline Transporter-like (CTL) Family
- 2.A.94 The Phosphate Permease (Pho1) Family
- 2.A.95 The 6TMS Neutral Amino Acid Transporter (NAAT) Family
- 2.A.96 The Acetate Uptake Transporter (AceTr) Family
- 2.A.97 The Mitochondrial Inner Membrane K^{+}/H^{+} and Ca^{2+}/H^{+} Exchanger (LetM1) Family
- 2.A.98 The Putative Sulfate Exporter (PSE) Family
- 2.A.99 The 6TMS Ni^{2+} uptake transporter (HupE-UreJ) Family
- 2.A.100 The Ferroportin (Fpn) Family
- 2.A.101 The Malonate Uptake (MatC) Family (Formerly UIT1)
- 2.A.102 The 4-Toluene Sulfonate Uptake Permease (TSUP) Family
- 2.A.103 The Bacterial Murein Precursor Exporter (MPE) Family
- 2.A.104 The L-Alanine Exporter (AlaE) Family
- 2.A.105 The Mitochondrial Pyruvate Carrier (MPC) Family
- 2.A.106 The Ca^{2+}:H^{+} Antiporter-2 (CaCA2) Family
- 2.A.107 The MntP Mn^{2+} Exporter (MntP) Family
- 2.A.108 The Iron/Lead Transporter (ILT) Family
- 2.A.109 The Tellurium Ion Resistance (TerC) Family
- 2.A.110 The Heme Transporter, heme-responsive gene protein (HRG) Family
- 2.A.111 The Na^{+}/H^{+} Antiporter-E (NhaE) Family
- 2.A.112 The KX Blood-group Antigen (KXA) Family
- 2.A.113 The Nickel/cobalt Transporter (NicO) Family
- 2.A.114 The Putative Peptide Transporter Carbon Starvation CstA (CstA) Family
- 2.A.115 The Novobiocin Exporter (NbcE) Family
- 2.A.116 The Peptidoglycolipid Addressing Protein (GAP) Family
- 2.A.117 The Chlorhexadine Exporter (CHX) family
- 2.A.118 The Basic Amino Acid Antiporter (ArcD) Family
- 2.A.119 The Organo-Arsenical Exporter (ArsP) Family
- 2.A.120 The Putative Amino Acid Permease (PAAP) Family
- 2.A.121 The Sulfate Transporter (CysZ) Family
- 2.A.122 The LrgB/CidB holin-like auxiliary protein (LrgB/CidB) Family
- 2.A.123 The Sweet; PQ-loop; Saliva; MtN3 (Sweet) Family
- 2.A.124 The Lysine Exporter (LysO) Family
- 2.A.125 The Eukaryotic Riboflavin Transporter (E-RFT) Family
- 2.A.126 The Fatty Acid Exporter (FAX) Family
- 2.A.127 Enterobacterial Cardiolipin Transporter (CLT) Family

==== 2.B Nonribosomally synthesized porters ====
- 2.B.1 The Valinomycin Carrier Family
- 2.B.2 The Monensin Family
- 2.B.3 The Nigericin Family
- 2.B.4 The Macrotetrolide Antibiotic (MA) Family
- 2.B.5 The Macrocyclic Polyether (MP) Family
- 2.B.6 The Ionomycin Family
- 2.B.7 The Transmembrane α-helical Peptide Phospholipid Translocation (TMP-PLT) Family
- 2.B.8 The Bafilomycin A1 (Bafilomycin) Family
- 2.B.9 The Cell Penetrating Peptide (CPP) Functional Family
- 2.B.10 The Synthetic CPP, Transportan Family
- 2.B.11 The Calcimycin or A23187 Carrier-type Ionophore Family
- 2.B.12 The Salinomycin Family
- 2.B.13 The Tetrapyrrolic Macrocyclic Anion Antiporter (TPMC-AA) Family
- 2.B.14 The Lasalocid A or X-537A Ionophore (Lasalocid) Family
- 2.B.15 The Tris-thiourea Tripodal-based Chloride Carrier (TTT-CC) Family
- 2.B.16 The Halogen-bond-containing Compound Anion Carrier (HCAC) Family
- 2.B.17 The Isophthalaminde Derivative H^{+}:Cl^{−} Co-transporter (IDC) Family
- 2.B.18 The Pyridine-2,6-Dicarboxamine Derivative (PDCA) H+:Cl^{−} Co-transporter Family
- 2.B.19 The Calix(4)pyrrole Derivative (C4P) Family
- 2.B.20 The Prodigiosin (Prodigiosin) Chloride/Bicarbonate Exchanger Family
- 2.B.21 The ortho-Phenylenediamine-bis-Urea Derivative Anion Transporter (oPDA-U) Family
- 2.B.22 The Imidazolium-functionalized Anion Transporter (IAT) Family
- 2.B.23 The Homotetrameric Transmembrane Zn^{2+}/Co^{2+}:Proton Synthetic Antiporter, Rocker (Rocker) Family
- 2.B.24 The 2,6-Bis(benzimidazol-2-yl)pyridine Anion Carrier (BBP-AC) Family
- 2.B.25 The Peptide-mediated Lipid Flip-Flop (PLFF) Family
- 2.B.26 The Bis(imidazolyl)-functionalized Bis(Choloyl) Conjugate (BIBCC) Family
- 2.B.27 The Tris-Urea Anion Transporter Family
- 2.B.29 The Anionophoric Marine Alkaloid Tambjamine Family

==== 2.C Ion-gradient-driven energizers ====
- 2.C.1 The TonB-ExbB-ExbD/TolA-TolQ-TolR (TonB) Family of Auxiliary Proteins for Energization of Outer Membrane Receptor (OMR)-mediated Active Transport

=== 3. Primary active transporters ===
==== 3.A. P-P-bond hydrolysis-driven transporters ====
- 3.A.1 ABC transporters including BtuCD, molybdate uptake transporter, Cystic fibrosis transmembrane conductance regulator and others
- 3.A.2 The H^{+}- or Na^{+}-translocating F-type ATPase, V-type ATPase and A-type ATPase superfamily
- 3.A.3 The P-type ATPase Superfamily
- 3.A.4 The Arsenite-Antimonite efflux family
- 3.A.5 General secretory pathway (Sec) translocon (preprotein translocase SecY)
- 3.A.6 The Type III (Virulence-related) Secretory Pathway (IIISP) Family
- 3.A.7 The Type IV (Conjugal DNA-Protein Transfer or VirB) Secretory Pathway (IVSP) Family
- 3.A.8 The Mitochondrial Protein Translocase (MPT) Family
- 3.A.9 The Chloroplast Envelope Protein Translocase (CEPT or Tic-Toc) Family
- 3.A.10 H^{+}, Na^{+}-translocating Pyrophosphatase family
- 3.A.11 The Bacterial Competence-related DNA Transformation Transporter (DNA-T) Family
- 3.A.12 The Septal DNA Translocator (S-DNA-T) Family
- 3.A.13 The Filamentous Phage Exporter (FPhE) Family
- 3.A.14 The Fimbrilin/Protein Exporter (FPE) Family
- 3.A.15 The Outer Membrane Protein Secreting Main Terminal Branch (MTB) Family
- 3.A.16 The Endoplasmic Reticular Retrotranslocon (ER-RT) Family
- 3.A.17 The Phage T7 Injectisome (T7 Injectisome) Family
- 3.A.18 The Nuclear mRNA Exporter (mRNA-E) Family
- 3.A.19 The TMS Recognition/Insertion Complex (TRC) Family
- 3.A.20 The Peroxisomal Protein Importer (PPI) Family
- 3.A.21 The C-terminal Tail-Anchored Membrane Protein Biogenesis/ Insertion Complex (TAMP-B) Family
- 3.A.22 The Transcription-coupled TREX/TAP Nuclear mRNA Export Complex (TREX) Family
- 3.A.23 The Type VI Symbiosis/Virulence Secretory Pathway (VISP) Family
- 3.A.24 Type VII or ESX Protein Secretion System (T7SS) Family
- 3.A.25 The Symbiont-specific ERAD-like Machinery (SELMA) Family
- 3.A.26 The Plasmodium Translocon of Exported proteins (PTEX) Family

==== 3.B Decarboxylation-driven transporters ====
- 3.B.1 The Na^{+}-transporting Carboxylic Acid Decarboxylase (NaT-DC) Family

==== 3.C Methyltransfer-driven transporters ====
- 3.C.1 The Na^{+} Transporting Methyltetrahydromethanopterin:Coenzyme M Methyltransferase (NaT-MMM) Family

==== 3.D. Oxidoreduction-driven transporters ====
They include a number of transmembrane cytochrome b-like proteins including coenzyme Q - cytochrome c reductase (cytochrome bc1 ); cytochrome b6f complex; formate dehydrogenase, respiratory nitrate reductase; succinate - coenzyme Q reductase (fumarate reductase); and succinate dehydrogenase. See electron transport chain.

- 3.D.1 The H^{+} or Na^{+}-translocating NADH Dehydrogenase ("complex I") family
- 3.D.2 The Proton-translocating Transhydrogenase (PTH) Family
- 3.D.3 The Proton-translocating Quinol:Cytochrome c Reductase) Superfamily
- 3.D.4 Proton-translocating Cytochrome Oxidase (COX) Superfamily
- 3.D.5 The Na^{+}-translocating NADH:Quinone Dehydrogenase (Na-NDH or NQR) Family
- 3.D.6 The Putative Ion (H^{+} or Na^{+})-translocating NADH:Ferredoxin Oxidoreductase (NFO or RNF) Family
- 3.D.7 The H_{2}:Heterodisulfide Oxidoreductase (HHO) Family
- 3.D.8 The Na^{+}- or H^{+}-Pumping Formyl Methanofuran Dehydrogenase (FMF-DH) Family
- 3.D.9 The H^{+}-translocating F420H2 Dehydrogenase (F420H2DH) Family
- 3.D.10 The Prokaryotic Succinate Dehydrogenase (SDH) Family

==== 3.E. Light absorption-driven transporters ====
- Bacteriorhodopsin-like proteins including rhodopsin (see also opsin)
- Bacterial photosynthetic reaction centres and photosystems I and II
- Light harvesting complexes from bacteria and chloroplasts

=== 4. Group translocators ===
==== 4.A Phosphotransfer-driven group translocators ====
- 4.A.1 The PTS Glucose-Glucoside (Glc) Family
- 4.A.2 The PTS Fructose-Mannitol (Fru) Family
- 4.A.3 The PTS Lactose-N,N'-Diacetylchitobiose-β-glucoside (Lac) Family
- 4.A.4 The PTS Glucitol (Gut) Family
- 4.A.5 The PTS Galactitol (Gat) Family
- 4.A.6 The PTS Mannose-Fructose-Sorbose (Man) Family
- 4.A.7 The PTS L-Ascorbate (L-Asc) Family

==== 4.B Nicotinamide ribonucleoside uptake transporters ====
- 4.B.1 The Nicotinamide Ribonucleoside (NR) Uptake Permease (PnuC) Family

==== 4.C Acyl CoA ligase-coupled transporters ====
- 4.C.1 The Proposed Fatty Acid Transporter (FAT) Family
- 4.C.2 The Carnitine O-Acyl Transferase (CrAT) Family
- 4.C.3 The Acyl-CoA Thioesterase (AcoT) Family

==== 4.D Polysaccharide Synthase/Exporters ====
- 4.D.1 The Putative Vectorial Glycosyl Polymerization (VGP) Family
- 4.D.2 The Glycosyl Transferase 2 (GT2) Family
- 4.D.3 The Glycan Glucosyl Transferase (OpgH) Family

==== 4.E. Vacuolar Polyphosphate Polymerase-catalyzed Group Translocators ====
- 4.E.1 The Vacuolar (Acidocalcisome) Polyphosphate Polymerase (V-PPP) Family

=== 5. Transport electron carriers ===
==== 5.A Transmembrane 2-electron transfer carriers ====
- 5.A.1 The Disulfide Bond Oxidoreductase D (DsbD) Family
- 5.A.2 The Disulfide Bond Oxidoreductase B (DsbB) Family
- 5.A.3 The Prokaryotic Molybdopterin-containing Oxidoreductase (PMO) Family

==== 5.B Transmembrane 1-electron transfer carriers ====
- 5.B.1 The Phagocyte (gp91phox) NADPH Oxidase Family
- 5.B.2 The Eukaryotic Cytochrome b561 (Cytb561) Family
- 5.B.3 The Geobacter Nanowire Electron Transfer (G-NET) Family
- 5.B.4 The Plant Photosystem I Supercomplex (PSI) Family
- 5.B.5 The Extracellular Metal Oxido-Reductase (EMOR) Family
- 5.B.6 The Transmembrane Epithelial Antigen Protein-3 Ferric Reductase (STEAP) Family
- 5.B.7 The YedZ (YedZ) Family
- 5.B.8 The Trans-Outer Membrane Electron Transfer Porin/Cytochrome Complex (ET-PCC) Family
- 5.B.9 The Porin-Cytochrome c (Cyc2) Family
