= Ascorbate ferrireductase (transmembrane) =

Class of enzymes

Identifiers
- EC no.: 1.16.5.1

Databases
- IntEnz: IntEnz view
- BRENDA: BRENDA entry
- ExPASy: NiceZyme view
- KEGG: KEGG entry
- MetaCyc: metabolic pathway
- PRIAM: profile
- PDB structures: RCSB PDB PDBe PDBsum
Search
- PMC: articles
- PubMed: articles
- NCBI: proteins

Ascorbate ferrireductase (transmembrane) (EC 1.16.5.1, cytochrome b561) is an enzyme with systematic name Fe(III):ascorbate oxidorectuctase (electron-translocating). This enzyme catalyses the following chemical reaction

ascorbate_{[in]} + Fe(III)_{[out]} $\rightleftharpoons$ monodehydroascorbate radical_{[in]} + Fe(II)_{[out]} + H^{+}_{[in]}

Ascorbate ferrireductase is a diheme cytochrome that acts on hexacyanoferrate(III) and other ferric chelates.

== Ferric Fe(III) and Ferrous Fe(II) Solubility ==
Using the conversion of ascorbate (Vitamin C) to monodehydroascorbate is essential when the ferric Fe(III) ion is converted to ferrous Fe(II).The Fe(III) species is insoluble, hence becoming one of the most problematic metal species to introduce and dissolve into an organism's system. Especially in eukaryotes such as humans, fungi, and bacteria, the upcycle of ascorbate is very important as well as the bioavailability of the ferrous (II) ion. There are three ways to increase the solubility of Iron (III) and overcome that challenge: chelation, reduction, and acidification.

=== Chelation ===
Chelation can increase the solubility of the iron (III) by coupling 'siderophore ligands' to the Iron species in its solid state to make it transform into an aqueous species. Especially in bacteria, and fungi, siderophores have a very strong binding affinity to Fe^{3+} and does not bind to other metal ions that may be present. The following is a general chemical equation to represent the process of chelation: A structure of a siderophore. The phenyls with two hydroxyl groups are the binding spots. These iron complexes binds to a receptor on an iron transport that is unique to the siderophore used. The receptor dissociates once it nears the cell's membrane which creates an aqueous ferric Fe(III) ion that can either be used for uptake or reduced to Fe^{2+} where transporters specific to that ion can transport it instead.

=== Reduction ===
Reducing the ferric(III) ion to ferrous (II) increases the bio availability which improves the rate and extent at which the aqueous soluble ferrous (II) iron will reach the system of the organism and will prevent the mineralization of the aqueous ferric(III). The general for a following reduction in relation to an iron complex is as follows:

Once the iron complex nears the cell surface, the Iron (II) ion becomes susceptible to accept water ligands, thus hydrating the ion. This process usually occurs in aerobic environments where the Iron (II) ion is also favored. Once the complex is reduced, it must be then re-oxidized in proximity to the cell membrane because it contains binding sites typically only for Iron (III) ions that the protein will then undergo conformational changes to transition to the other side of the membrane.

There are some transporters that allow the Iron (II) ions to be transported directly such as the Fet4, Dmt1, and the Irt1, however these transporters aren't exactly selective as they provide difficulty in binding to the Iron (II) ion so other ions bind as well such as Zn(II), Mn(II), and Cd(II). Transportation like this mainly takes place in plants and in anaerobic environments where oxidation back to the Iron (III) species is impossible.
