= Nucleoside-specific porin =

Nucleoside-specific channel-forming protein, Tsx
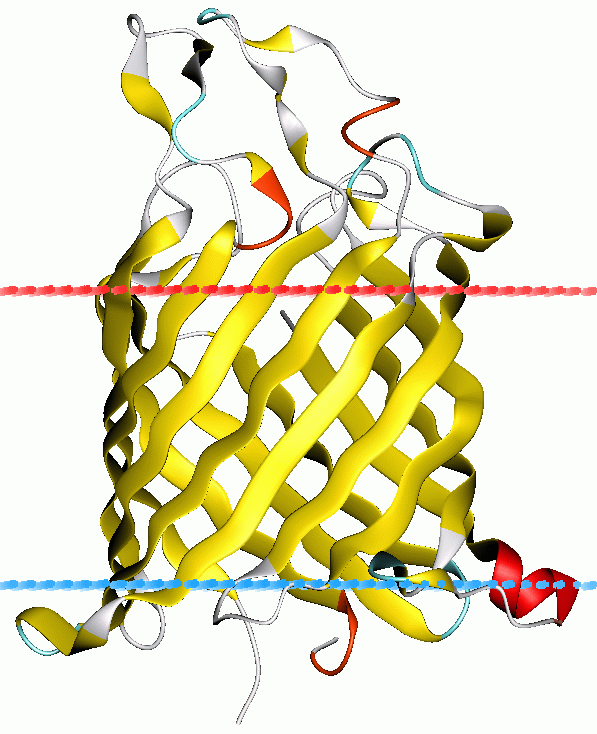

Identifiers
- Symbol: Channel_Tsx
- Pfam: PF03502
- InterPro: IPR003055
- TCDB: 1.B.10
- OPM superfamily: 9
- OPM protein: 1tly
Available protein structures:
- PDB: IPR003055 PF03502 (ECOD; PDBsum)
- AlphaFold: IPR003055; PF03502

Nucleoside-specific porin (the tsx gene of Escherichia coli) is an outer membrane protein, Tsx, which constitutes the receptor for colicin K and Bacteriophage T6, and functions as a substrate-specific channel for nucleosides and deoxy-nucleosides. The protein contains 294 amino acids, the first 22 of which are characteristic of a bacterial signal sequence peptide. Tsx shows no significant similarities to general bacterial porins.
