= Proton-dependent oligopeptide transporter =

POT family

Identifiers
- Symbol: PTR2
- Pfam: PF00854
- InterPro: IPR000109
- PROSITE: PDOC00784
- TCDB: 2.A.17
- OPM superfamily: 15
- OPM protein: 2xut
Available protein structures:
- PDB: IPR000109 PF00854 (ECOD; PDBsum)
- AlphaFold: IPR000109; PF00854

Proteins of the Proton-dependent Oligopeptide Transporter (POT) Family (also called the PTR (peptide transport) family) are found in animals, plants, yeast, archaea and both Gram-negative and Gram-positive bacteria, and are part of the major facilitator superfamily. The transport of peptides into cells is a well-documented biological phenomenon which is accomplished by specific, energy-dependent transporters found in a number of organisms as diverse as bacteria and humans. The proton-dependent oligopeptide transporter (PTR) family of proteins is distinct from the ABC-type peptide transporters and was uncovered by sequence analyses of a number of recently discovered peptide transport proteins. These proteins that seem to be mainly involved in the intake of small peptides with the concomitant uptake of a proton.

== Function ==
While most members of the POT family catalyze peptide transport, one is a nitrate permease and one can transport histidine, as well as peptides. Some of the peptide transporters can also transport antibiotics. They function by proton symport, but the substrate:H^{+} stoichiometry is variable: the high-affinity rat PepT2 carrier catalyzes uptake of 2 and 3 H^{+} with neutral and anionic dipeptides, respectively, while the low affinity PepT1 carrier catalyzes uptake of one H^{+} per neutral peptide.

== Transport Reaction ==
The generalized transport reaction catalyzed by the proteins of the POT family is:

substrate (out) + H (out) → substrate (in) H^{+} (in)

== Structure and Mechanism ==
The proteins are of about 450-600 amino acyl residues in length with the eukaryotic proteins in general being longer than the bacterial proteins. They exhibit 12 putative or established transmembrane α-helical spanners.

Pairs of salt bridge interactions between transmembrane helices work in tandem to orchestrate alternating access transport within the PTR family. Key roles for residues conserved between bacterial and eukaryotic homologues suggest a conserved mechanism of peptide recognition and transport that in some cases has been subtly modified in individual species.

== Subfamilies ==
- Oligopeptide transporter, peptide:H+ symporter InterPro: IPR004768
- Amino acid/peptide transporter InterPro: IPR005279

== Human proteins containing this domain ==
FP12591; PEPT1; PTR4; SLC15A1; SLC15A2; SLC15A3; SLC15A4; hPEPT1-RF;
