= Peptaibol =

Family of transport proteins

Identifiers
- Symbol: N/A
- TCDB: 1.D.5
- OPM superfamily: 44
- OPM protein: 1ob7

Peptaibols are biologically active peptides containing between seven and twenty amino acid residues, some of which are non-proteinogenic amino acids. In particular, they contain α-aminoisobutyric acid along with other unusual aminoacids such as ethylnorvaline, isovaline and hydroxyproline; the N-terminus is acetylated, and the C-terminal amino acid is hydroxylated to an acid alcohol. They are named pebtaibols due to them being peptides containing α-aminoisobutyric acid (Aib) and ending in an alcohol. They are produced by certain fungi, mainly in the genus Trichoderma, as secondary metabolites which function as antibiotics and antifungal agents. Some are referred to as trichorzianines. They are amphipathic which allows them to form voltage-dependent ion channels in cell membranes which create holes in the membrane making them leaky and leading to the death of the cells. As of 2001, over 317 peptaibols had been identified. The most widely known peptaibol is alamethicin.
