= Testis-enhanced gene transfer family =

Group of transport proteins

Testis-enhanced gene transcript family

Identifiers
- Symbol: TEGT
- Pfam: PF01027
- TCDB: 1.A.14
- OPM superfamily: 703
- OPM protein: 4pgr
Available protein structures:
- Pfam: structures / ECOD
- PDB: RCSB PDB; PDBe; PDBj
- PDBsum: structure summary

The testis-enhanced gene transcript (TEGT) family includes the testis-enhanced gene transcript proteins of mammals, which are expressed at high levels in the testis, the putative glutamate/aspartate binding proteins of plants and animals, the YccA protein of Escherichia coli and the YetJ protein of Bacillus subtilis. These proteins are about 200-250 residues in length and exhibit 7 TMSs.

== Homology ==
Homologues are found in a variety of Gram-negative and Gram-positive bacteria, yeast, fungi, plants, animals and viruses. The E. coli genome encodes three paralogues, YbhL, YbhM and YccA. Distant homologues found in Drosophilia melanogaster and the rat are the N-methyl-D-aspartate receptor-associated protein (NMDARAI) and the N-methyl-D-aspartate receptor glutamate binding chain, respectively. Two others are the rat neural membrane protein 35 and the Arabidopsis thaliana Bax inhibitor-1 (BI-1) protein capable of suppressing Bax-induced cell death in yeast.

== BI-1 ==
One of these proteins, TEGT or the Bax Inhibitor-1 (TC# 1.A.14.1.1), has a C-terminal domain that forms a Ca^{2+}-permeable channel. BI-1 is an ER-localized protein that protects against apoptosis and ER stress. BI-1 has been proposed to modulate ER Ca^{2+} homeostasis by acting as a Ca^{2+}-leak channel. These proteins are distantly related to the ionotropic glutamate-binding protein of the N-methyl D-aspartate (NMDA) receptor of man. Homologues include a putative cold shock inducible protein and a SecY stabilizing protein.

== Function ==
Based on experimental determination of the BI-1 topology, Bultynck et al. proposes that its C-terminal α-helical 20 amino acid peptide catalyzes Ca^{2+} flux both in vivo and in vitro. The Ca^{2+}-leak properties were conserved among animal, but not plant and yeast orthologs. By mutating one of the critical aspartate residues (D_{213}) in the proposed Ca^{2+}-channel pore in full-length BI-1, D_{213} proved to be essential for BI-1 dependent ER Ca^{2+}-leak.

== Structure ==
Chang et al. published crystal structures of a bacterial homolog, YetJ (TC# 1.A.14.2.3) at 1.9 Å resolution and characterized its calcium leak activity. Its seven-transmembrane-helix fold features two triple-helix sandwiches wrapped around a central C-terminal helix. Structures obtained in closed and open conformations are reversibly interconvertible by changes in the pH. A hydrogen-bonded perturbed pair of conserved aspartyl residues explains the pH dependence of this transition, and the pH regulates calcium influx in proteoliposomes. Homology models for human BI-1 provided insight into its cytoprotective activity.

== Transport Reaction ==
The generalized reaction catalyzed by TEGT channels is:

cations (out) ⇌ cations (in)
