= Tellurite-resistance/dicarboxylate transporter =

C4dic_mal_tran

Identifiers
- Symbol: C4dic_mal_tran
- Pfam: PF03595
- InterPro: IPR004695
- TCDB: 2.A.16
- OPM superfamily: 213
- OPM protein: 3m73
Available protein structures:
- PDB: IPR004695 PF03595 (ECOD; PDBsum)
- AlphaFold: IPR004695; PF03595

Two members of the Tellurite-Resistance/Dicarboxylate Transporter (TDT) family have been functionally characterised. One is the TehA protein of Escherichia coli which has been implicated in resistance to tellurite; the other is the Mae1 protein of Schizosaccharomyces pombe which functions in the uptake of malate and other dicarboxylates by a proton symport mechanism. These proteins have 10 putative transmembrane helices.
