= Glycoside-pentoside-hexuronide:cation symporter family =

Family of transport proteins

Identifiers
- Symbol: ?
- InterPro: IPR001927
- TCDB: 2.A.2
- OPM superfamily: 15
- OPM protein: 4m64

The Glycoside-Pentoside-Hexuronide (GPH):Cation Symporter Family is part of the major facilitator superfamily and catalyzes uptake of sugars (mostly, but not exclusively, glycosides) in symport with a monovalent cation (H^{+} or Na^{+}). The various members of the family have been reported to use Na^{+}, H^{+} or Li, Na^{+} or Li^{+}, or all three cations as the symported cation.

== Structure ==
Proteins of the GHP family are generally about 500 amino acids in length, although the Gram-positive bacterial lactose permeases are larger, due to a C-terminal hydrophilic domain that is involved in regulation by the phosphotransferase system. All of these proteins possess twelve putative transmembrane α-helical spanners.

== Homology ==
Homologues are from bacteria, including the distantly related sucrose:H^{+} symporters of plants and a yeast maltose/sucrose:H^{+} symporter of Schizosaccharomyces pombe. This yeast protein is about 24% identical to the plant sucrose:H^{+} symporters and is more distantly related to the bacterial members of the GPH family. Limited sequence similarity of some of these proteins with members of the major facilitator superfamily has been observed, and their 3D structures are clearly similar.

== Transport Reaction ==
The generalized transport reaction catalyzed by the GPH:cation symporter family is:

Sugar (out) + [H^{+} or Na^{+}] (out) → Sugar (in) + [H^{+} or Na^{+}] (in)
