= FadL outer membrane protein transport family =

Outer membrane transport proteins (OMPP1/FadL/TodX)
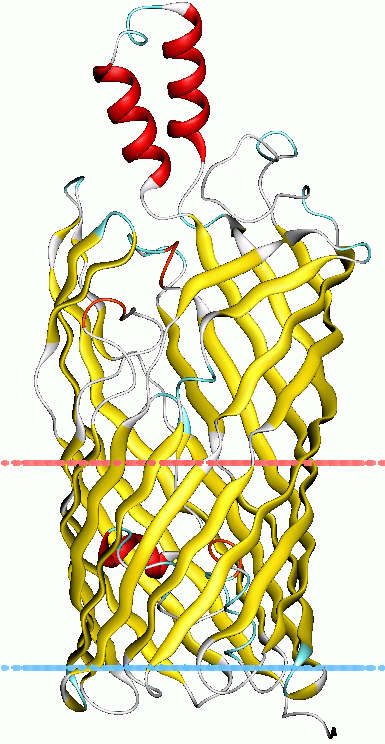
- Structure of the bacterial fatty acid transporter FadL.

Identifiers
- Symbol: Toluene_X
- Pfam: PF03349
- Pfam clan: CL0193
- InterPro: IPR005017
- TCDB: 1.B.9
- OPM superfamily: 30
- OPM protein: 1t16
Available protein structures:
- Pfam: structures / ECOD
- PDB: RCSB PDB; PDBe; PDBj
- PDBsum: structure summary
- PDB: 1t1lB:28-446 1t16B:28-446

Outer membrane transport proteins (OMPP1/FadL/TodX) family includes several proteins that are involved in toluene catabolism and degradation of aromatic hydrocarbons. This family also includes protein FadL involved in translocation of long-chain fatty acids across the outer membrane. It is also a receptor for the bacteriophage T2.
