= Cytochrome b561 family =

Protein family

Eukaryotic cytochrome b561

Identifiers
- Symbol: Cytochrom_B561
- Pfam: PF03188
- Pfam clan: CL0328
- InterPro: IPR004877
- TCDB: 5.B.2
- OPM superfamily: 92
- OPM protein: 4o6y
- CDD: cd08554
Available protein structures:
- PDB: IPR004877 PF03188 (ECOD; PDBsum)
- AlphaFold: IPR004877; PF03188

Prokaryotic cytochrome b561

Identifiers
- Symbol: Ni_hydr_CYTB
- Pfam: PF01292
- Pfam clan: CL0328
- InterPro: IPR011577
- PROSITE: PDOC00688
- OPM superfamily: 92
- OPM protein: 5oc0
Available protein structures:
- PDB: IPR011577 PF01292 (ECOD; PDBsum)
- AlphaFold: IPR011577; PF01292

The Cytochrome b561 family is a family of integral membrane proteins which bind two heme groups non-covalently. These proteins are related to cytochrome b561 and function as ascorbate-dependent oxidoreductase enzymes.

== Human proteins containing this domain ==
- CYB561;
- CYB561D1;
- CYB561D2;
- CYBASC3;
- CYBRD1;
