= Clostridial cytotoxin family =

Identifiers
- Symbol: CCT
- Pfam: PF04488
- TCDB: 1.C.57
- OPM superfamily: 199
- OPM protein: 2vk9
Available protein structures:
- PDB: PF04488 (ECOD; PDBsum)
- AlphaFold: PF04488

The clostridial cytotoxin family or CCT family is a member of the RTX-toxin superfamily. There are currently 13 classified members belonging to the CCT family. A representative list of these proteins is available in the Transporter Classification Database. Homologues are found in a variety of Gram-positive and Gram-negative bacteria.

== Clostridioides difficile cytotoxins ==
Clostridioides difficile, the causative agent of nosocomial antibiotic-associated diarrhea and pseudomembranous colitis, possesses two main virulence factors: the large clostridial cytotoxins A (TcdA) and B (TcdB). Action by large clostridial toxins (LCTs) from Clostridioides difficile includes four steps: (1) receptor-mediated endocytosis, (2) translocation of a catalytic glucosyltransferase domain across the membrane, (3) release of the enzymatic part by auto-proteolysis, and (4) inactivation of Rho family proteins. Cleavage of toxin B and all other large clostridial cytotoxins is an autocatalytic process dependent on host cytosolic inositolphosphate cofactors. A covalent inhibitor of aspartate proteases, 1,2-epoxy-3-(p-nitrophenoxy)propane or EPNP, completely blocks toxin B function on cultured cells and has been used to identify the catalytically active protease site. The toxin uses eukaryotic signals for induced auto-proteolysis to deliver its toxic domain into the cytosol of target cells. Reineke et al. (2007) present an integrated model for the uptake and inositol phosphate-induced activation of toxin B.

Clostridioides difficile infection, caused by the actions of the homologous toxins TcdA and TcdB on colonic epithelial cells is due to binding to target cells which triggers toxin internalization into acidified vesicles, whereupon cryptic segments from within the 1,050-aa translocation domain unfurl and insert into the bounding membrane, creating a transmembrane passageway to the cytosol. Sensitive residues clustered between amino acyl residues 1,035 and 1,107, when individually mutated, reduced cellular toxicity by >1,000-fold. Defective variants exhibit impaired pore formation in planar lipid bilayers and biological membranes, resulting in an inability to intoxicate cells through either apoptotic or necrotic pathways. The findings suggest similarities between the pore-forming 'hotspots' of TcdB and the diphtheria toxin translocation domain.

== Function ==
Proteolytically processed clostridial cytotoxins A (306 kDa) and B (269 kDa) are O-glycosyltransferases that modify small GTPases of the Rho family by glucosylation of threonine residues, thereby blocking the action of the GTPases as switches of signal processes such as those mediated by the actin cytoskeleton. The toxins thus induce redistribution of actin filaments and cause the cells to round up. The catalytic domains of CCTs probably enter the cytoplasm from acidic endosomes. The toxins form ion-permeable channels in cell membranes and artificial bilayers when exposed to acidic pH. pH-dependent channel formation has been demonstrated for C. difficile toxin B and C as well as Clostridium sordellii lethal toxin (TcsL). Low pH presumably induces conformational/structural changes that promote membrane insertion and channel formation.

== Structure ==
Cytotoxins of the CCT family are large (e.g., toxin B of C. difficile is 2366 aas long) and tripartite with the N-terminal domain being the catalytic unit, the C-terminal domain being the cellular receptor and the central hydrophobic domain being the channel-former. In this respect, they superficially resemble diphtheria toxin (DT) although no significant sequence similarity between CCTs and DT is observed. The E. coli toxin B protein and the chlamydial TC0437 protein are of 3169 aas and 3255 aas, respectively. The distantly related ToxA toxin of Pasteurella multocida is 1285 aas while the E. coli Cnf1 and 2 toxins,) are 1014 aas, and the RTX cytotoxin of Vibrio vulnificus) is 5206 aas.

== Transport reaction ==
The generalized transport reactions catalyzed by CCTs are:

N-terminal catalytic domain (out) → N-terminal catalytic domain (in)
Ions and other solutes (in) → Ions and other solutes (out)

== See also ==
- Clostridioides difficile toxin B
- Clostridioides difficile colitis
- RTX toxin
- Transporter Classification Database
