= BNIP3L =

Protein-coding gene in the species Homo sapiens

Identifiers
- Aliases: BNIP3L, BNIP3a, NIX, BCL2/adenovirus E1B 19kDa interacting protein 3-like, BCL2 interacting protein 3 like
- External IDs: OMIM: 605368; MGI: 3642435; HomoloGene: 3195; GeneCards: BNIP3L; OMA:BNIP3L - orthologs

Gene location (Human)
Chr.	Chromosome 8 (human)
Band	8p21.2	Start	26,383,054 bp
Band	8p21.2	End	26,505,636 bp
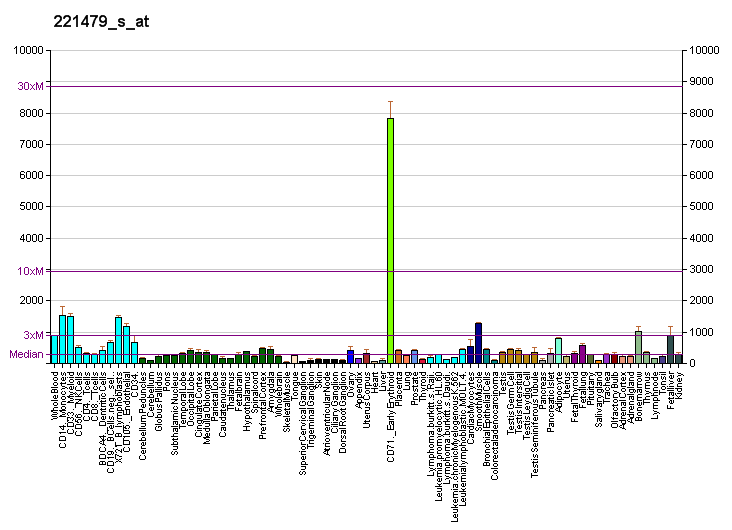

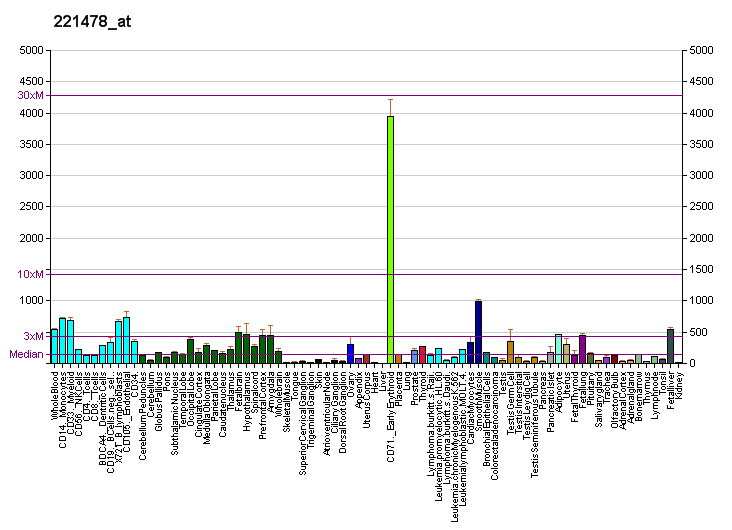
RNA expression pattern
Bgee	Human / Mouse (ortholog); Top expressed in: trabecular bone; lactiferous duct; ventricular zone; nipple; pericardium; external globus pallidus; corpus epididymis; bone marrow; inferior ganglion of vagus nerve; caput epididymis / n/a; More reference expression data
BioGPS	More reference expression data
Gene ontology
Molecular function	protein homodimerization activity; protein binding; identical protein binding; protein heterodimerization activity; lamin binding
Cellular component	integral component of membrane; nuclear envelope; membrane; endoplasmic reticulum; mitochondrion; intrinsic component of membrane; mitochondrial envelope; nucleus; mitochondrial outer membrane; cytosol; nuclear speck
Biological process	negative regulation of apoptotic process; negative regulation of cell death; positive regulation of macroautophagy; regulation of autophagy of mitochondrion; defense response to virus; regulation of protein targeting to mitochondrion; positive regulation of apoptotic process; viral process; mitochondrial outer membrane permeabilization; mitochondrial protein catabolic process; cellular response to hypoxia; apoptotic process; regulation of apoptotic process; negative regulation of mitochondrial membrane potential; positive regulation of mitochondrial membrane permeability
Sources:Amigo / QuickGO
Orthologs
Species	Human	Mouse
Entrez	665	100043324
Ensembl	ENSG00000104765	n/a
UniProt	O60238; Q6IBV1	n/a
RefSeq (mRNA)	NM_004331; NM_001330491	XM_036157725
RefSeq (protein)	NP_001317420; NP_004322; NP_004322.1	n/a
Location (UCSC)	Chr 8: 26.38 – 26.51 Mb	n/a
PubMed search
- Wikidata
View/Edit Human	View/Edit Mouse

BCL2/adenovirus E1B 19 kDa protein-interacting protein 3-like is a protein that in humans is encoded by the BNIP3L gene.

== Function ==
This gene is a member of the BCL2/adenovirus E1B 19 kd-interacting protein (BNIP) family. It interacts with the E1B 19 kDa protein which is responsible for the protection of virally induced cell death, as well as E1B 19 kDa-like sequences of BCL2, also an apoptotic protector. The protein encoded by this gene is a functional homolog of BNIP3, a proapoptotic protein. This protein may function simultaneously with BNIP3 and may play a role in tumor suppression.

== Interactions ==
BNIP3L has been shown to interact with STEAP3.
