= 2-Aminoisobutyric acid =

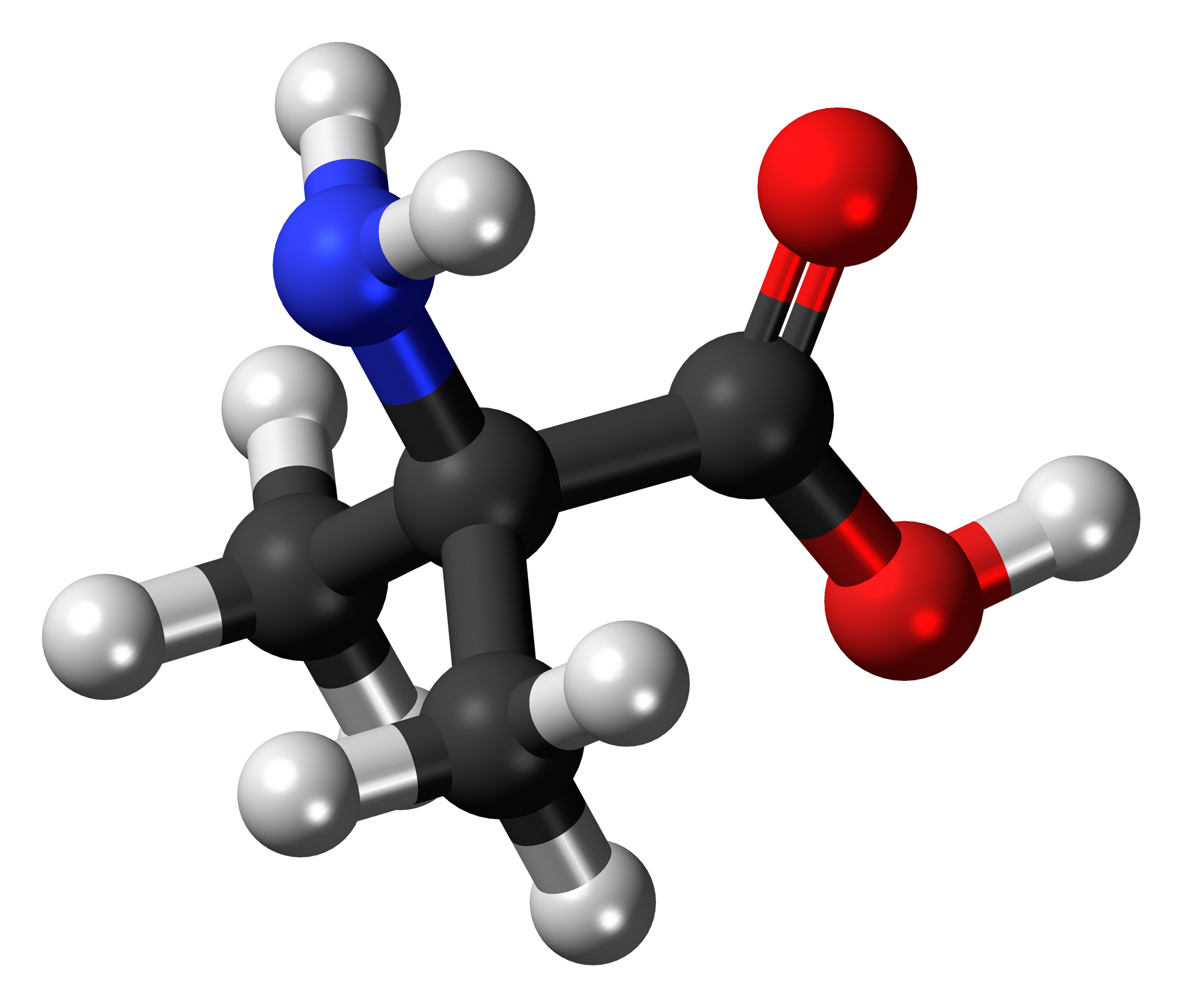

Names
- Preferred IUPAC name 2-Amino-2-methylpropanoic acid
- Other names α-Aminoisobutyric acid 2-Methylalanine α-methylalanine

Identifiers
CAS Number	62-57-7
3D model (JSmol)	Interactive image
ChEBI	CHEBI:27971
ChemSpider	5891
DrugBank	DB02952
ECHA InfoCard	100.000.495
EC Number	200-544-0
KEGG	C03665
PubChem CID	6119
UNII	1E7ZW41IQU
CompTox Dashboard (EPA)	DTXSID0058772
- InChI: InChI=1S/C4H9NO2/c1-4(2,5)3(6)7/h5H2,1-2H3,(H,6,7) Key: FUOOLUPWFVMBKG-UHFFFAOYSA-N; InChI=1/C4H9NO2/c1-4(2,5)3(6)7/h5H2,1-2H3,(H,6,7) Key: FUOOLUPWFVMBKG-UHFFFAOYAD
- SMILES: O=C(O)C(N)(C)C

Properties
Chemical formula	C_{4}H_{9}NO_{2}
Molar mass	103.12 g/mol
Appearance	white crystalline powder
Density	1.09 g/mL
Boiling point	204.4 °C (399.9 °F; 477.5 K)
Solubility in water	soluble
Acidity (pK_{a})	2.36 (carboxyl; H_{2}O); 10.21 (amino; H_{2}O)
- Except where otherwise noted, data are given for materials in their standard state (at 25 °C [77 °F], 100 kPa). verify (what is ?) Infobox references

2-Aminoisobutyric acid (Aib) is the non-proteinogenic amino acid with the structural formula H_{2}N-C(CH_{3})_{2}-COOH. The Aib residue is a component of tirzepatide, a commonly prescribed antidiabetic medication for treatment of type 2 diabetes. Although uncommon, it is also found in some natural products

== Synthesis and structure ==
2-Aminoisobutyric acid can be prepared from acetone cyanohydrin, by reaction with ammonia followed by hydrolysis.

The compound is not chiral, unlike most amino acids. It is a strong helix inducer in peptides due to Thorpe–Ingold effect of its gem-dimethyl group. Oligomers of Aib form 3_{10} helices.

== Biological activity ==
2-Aminoisobutyric acid is not one of the proteinogenic amino acids and is rather rare in nature (cf. non-proteinogenic amino acids). In the context of cell-free protein synthesis 2-aminoisobutyric acid is compatible with ribosomal elongation of peptide synthesis. Flexizymes and an engineered tRNA body enhance the affinity of aminoacylated Aib-tRNA species to elongation factor P. The result was an increased incorporation of Aib into peptides in a cell free translation system. Iqbal et al.. used an alternative approach of creating an editing deficient valine—tRNA ligase to synthesize aminoacylated Aib-tRNA^{Val}. The aminoacylated tRNA was subsequently used in a cell-free translation system to yield Aib-containing peptides.

== Other occurrences ==
Aib has been found in meteorites and some antibiotics of fungal origin, such as alamethicin and some lantibiotics.
