= SLC15A4 =

Protein-coding gene in the species Homo sapiens

Identifiers
- Aliases: SLC15A4, PHT1, PTR4, FP12591, solute carrier family 15 member 4
- External IDs: OMIM: 615806; MGI: 2140796; GeneCards: SLC15A4

Gene location (Human)
Chr.	Chromosome 12 (human)
Band	12q24.33	Start	128,793,194 bp
Band	12q24.33	End	128,823,958 bp

Gene location (Mouse)
Chr.	Chromosome 5 (mouse)
Band	5|5 G1.2	Start	127,672,728 bp
Band	5|5 G1.2	End	127,709,961 bp
RNA expression pattern
Bgee	Human / Mouse (ortholog); Top expressed in: pancreatic ductal cell; secondary oocyte; tibialis anterior muscle; blood; sperm; deltoid muscle; gastrocnemius muscle; cartilage tissue; synovial joint; thymus / Top expressed in: spermatocyte; primary oocyte; mesenteric lymph nodes; medullary collecting duct; spleen; muscle of thigh; granulocyte; stroma of bone marrow; secondary oocyte; blood; More reference expression data
BioGPS	n/a
Gene ontology
Molecular function	symporter activity; transporter activity; peptide:proton symporter activity; protein binding; transmembrane transporter activity; L-histidine transmembrane transporter activity; oligopeptide transmembrane transporter activity; peptide transmembrane transporter activity
Cellular component	lysosomal membrane; membrane; integral component of membrane; plasma membrane; specific granule membrane
Biological process	oligopeptide transport; protein transport; ion transport; peptide transport; transmembrane transport; neutrophil degranulation; proton transmembrane transport; histidine transport; oligopeptide transmembrane transport; L-histidine transmembrane transport
Sources:Amigo / QuickGO
Orthologs
Databases	NCBI: entry; OMA: entry
Species	Human	Mouse
Entrez	121260	100561
Ensembl	ENSG00000139370	ENSMUSG00000029416
UniProt	Q8N697	Q91W98
RefSeq (mRNA)	NM_145648	NM_133895
RefSeq (protein)	NP_663623	NP_598656
Location (UCSC)	Chr 12: 128.79 – 128.82 Mb	Chr 5: 127.67 – 127.71 Mb
PubMed search
- Wikidata
View/Edit Human	View/Edit Mouse

Solute carrier family 15, member 4 is a protein in humans that is encoded by the SLC15A4 gene.

== See also ==
- Solute carrier family
- SLC15A1
- SLC15A2
