= Tic110 family =

Group of transport proteins

The Chloroplast Envelope Anion Channel-forming Tic110 (Tic110) Family (TC#1.A.18) consists of proteins of the inner chloroplast envelope membrane. This family consists of the inner membrane protein import apparatus, and appears to be a protein import-related anion-selective channel. It has also been designated (1) IEP110, (2) IAP100 and (3) protein import-related anion channel (PIRAC).

== Location ==
Most of the Tic110 protein is probably in the intermembrane space. Transport across the outer and inner membranes probably occurs by two independent processes.

== Structure ==
Arabidopsis thaliana Tic 110 is 996 amino acyl residues long and exhibits 2 putative transmembrane segments (TMSs) near its N-terminus at positions 74-92 and 101-120. Biochemical analyses suggest that this protein is part of a 600 kDa complex. Tic110 has two proposed functions with naturally exclusive structures; a protein-conducting channel with 6 TMSs, and a scaffold with 2 N-terminal TMSs followed by a large soluble domain for binding transit peptides and other stromal translocon components. The C-terminal half of Tic110 possesses a rod-shaped helix-repeat structure that is too flattened and elongated to be a channel. The structure is most similar to the HEAT-repeat motif that functions as scaffolds for protein-protein interactions. The pore size was estimated to be about 6.5 Å.

== Transport Reaction ==
The transport reactions across the chloroplast inner membrane catalyzed by Tic110 are:

(1) anions (out) ⇌ anions (in)
(2) proteins (out) → proteins (in)
