= ATP:ADP antiporter family =

Family of transport proteins

The ATP:ADP Antiporter (AAA) Family (TC# 2.A.12) is a member of the major facilitator superfamily. Members of the AAA family have been sequenced from bacteria and plants.

== Structure and function ==
One protein from the obligate intracellular bacterial parasite, Rickettsia prowazekii, is of 498 amino acyl residues, and is believed to span the membrane 12 times. The transporter is an obligate exchange translocase specific for ATP and ADP. It functions to take up ATP from the eukaryotic cell cytoplasm into the bacterium in exchange for ADP. The ATP/ADP uniporters can also transport inorganic phosphate, but not ribonucleoside and monophosphates, as well as deoxyribonucleotides.

== Transport reaction ==
The transport reaction catalyzed by the antiporters is:

ATP (out) + ADP (in) ⇌ ATP (in) + ADP (out)

== Homology ==
The AAA family proteins are distantly related to members of the major facilitator superfamily, and are not related to the mitochondrial ATP/ADP exchangers of the mitochondrial carrier family which pump ATP out of mitochondria in accordance with the polarity of the mitochondrial membrane potential.
