= Non-selective cation channel-2 family =

Group of transport proteins

Members of the Non-Selective Cation Channel-2 (NSCC2) Family (TC#1.A.15) have been sequenced from various yeast, fungal and animals species including Saccharomyces cerevisiae, Drosophila melanogaster and Homo sapiens. These proteins are the Sec62 proteins, believed to be associated with the Sec61 and Sec63 constituents of the general protein secretory systems of yeast microsomes. They are also the non-selective (NS) cation channels of the mammalian cytoplasmic membrane.

== Function ==
NSCC2 channels are believed to provide entry pathways in response to growth factors. The yeast Sec62 protein has been shown to be essential for cell growth. The mammalian NS channel proteins have been implicated in platelet derived growth factor (PDGF)-dependent single channel current in fibroblasts. These channels are essentially closed in serum deprived tissue-culture cells and are specifically opened by exposure to PDGF.

The channels are reported to exhibit equal selectivity for Na^{+} , K^{+} and Cs^{+} with low permeability to Ca^{2+} , and no permeability to anions. Channel open probability is voltage- and cytoplasmic Ca^{2+}-independent.

== Transport reaction ==
The generalized transport reaction catalyzed by members of the NSCC2 family is:

Cation (out) ⇌ cation (in)

== Structure and location ==
Sequenced NSCC2 family proteins are 283-402 amino acyl residues in length and exhibit two putative transmembrane α-helical segments (TMSs). The S. cerevisiae protein, of 283 amino acyl residues, has cytoplasmic N- and C-termini with two putative TMSs at positions 159-178 and 193-213. The C-terminal 25 residues are rich in arginine and lysine. These proteins have been reported to be present in both endoplasmic reticular and cytoplasmic membranes.
