= Syringomycin E =

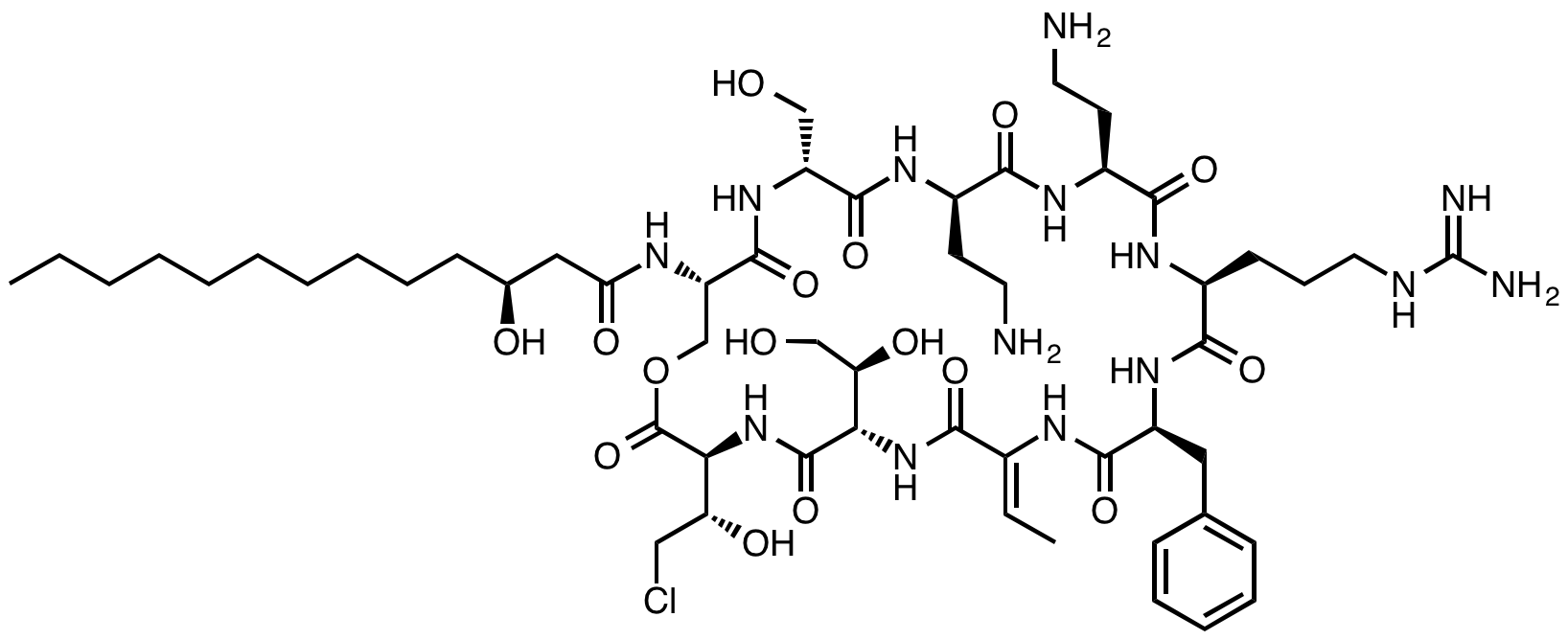

Identifiers
| CAS Number | 124888-22-8 |
| 3D model (JSmol) | Interactive image |
| ChemSpider | 28296139 |
| PubChem CID | 16219978 |
| CompTox Dashboard (EPA) | DTXSID60583283 |
- InChI: InChI=1S/C53H85ClN14O17/c1-3-5-6-7-8-12-17-30(70)25-39(72)60-37-28-85-52(84)40(38(71)26-54)67-50(81)41(42(73)51(82)83)68-46(77)31(14-4-2)61-47(78)35(24-29-15-10-9-11-16-29)65-43(74)32(18-13-23-59-53(57)58)62-44(75)33(19-21-55)63-45(76)34(20-22-56)64-48(79)36(27-69)66-49(37)80/h9-11,14-16,30,32-38,40-42,69-71,73H,3-8,12-13,17-28,55-56H2,1-2H3,(H,60,72)(H,61,78)(H,62,75)(H,63,76)(H,64,79)(H,65,74)(H,66,80)(H,67,81)(H,68,77)(H,82,83)(H4,57,58,59)/b31-14-/t30?,32-,33-,34-,35-,36-,37-,38+,40-,41+,42?/m0/s1 Key: YMFYPHGOLKNWQN-WMJMADPPSA-N
- SMILES: CCCCCCCCC(CC(=O)N[C@H]1COC(=O)[C@@H](NC(=O)[C@H](NC(=O)/C(=C/CC)/NC(=O)[C@@H](NC(=O)[C@@H](NC(=O)[C@@H](NC(=O)[C@@H](NC(=O)[C@@H](NC1=O)CO)CCN)CCN)CCCN=C(N)N)CC2=CC=CC=C2)C(C(=O)O)O)[C@@H](CCl)O)O

Properties
| Chemical formula | C_{53}H_{85}ClN_{14}O_{17} |
| Molar mass | 1225.78 |
| Appearance | white solid |
- Except where otherwise noted, data are given for materials in their standard state (at 25 °C [77 °F], 100 kPa). Infobox references

Syringomycin E is a member of a class of lipodepsinonapeptide molecules that are secreted by the plant pathogen Pseudomonas syringae. Lipodepsinonapeptides comprise a closed ring of nine nonribosomally synthesized amino acids bonded to a fatty acid hydrocarbon tail. A commonly encountered pathovar (pv) of P. syringae is P. syringae pv syringae, which secretes a number of closely related forms of the molecule. Syringomycins are virulence determinants, which means that their secretion is required for the manifestation of disease symptoms on a number of stone fruit crop plants.

Syringomycins have two widely recognized mechanisms of action. They can function as detergents which are powerful enough to dissolve plant membranes at high concentrations. It is not clear whether concentrations high enough to dissolve membranes are ever reached in planta. In addition to being surfactants, aggregates of syringomycins can insert into plant cell membranes and form small pores. These pores allow the leakage of ions from the plant cell cytoplasm. Affected plant cells are unable to maintain their required levels of electrolyte and ultimately cell death and lysis occurs. It is believed that P. syringae benefits from the release of nutrients that occurs as a consequence of cellular lysis.

The biosynthesis of this class of molecules has been elucidated.
