= Alamethicin =

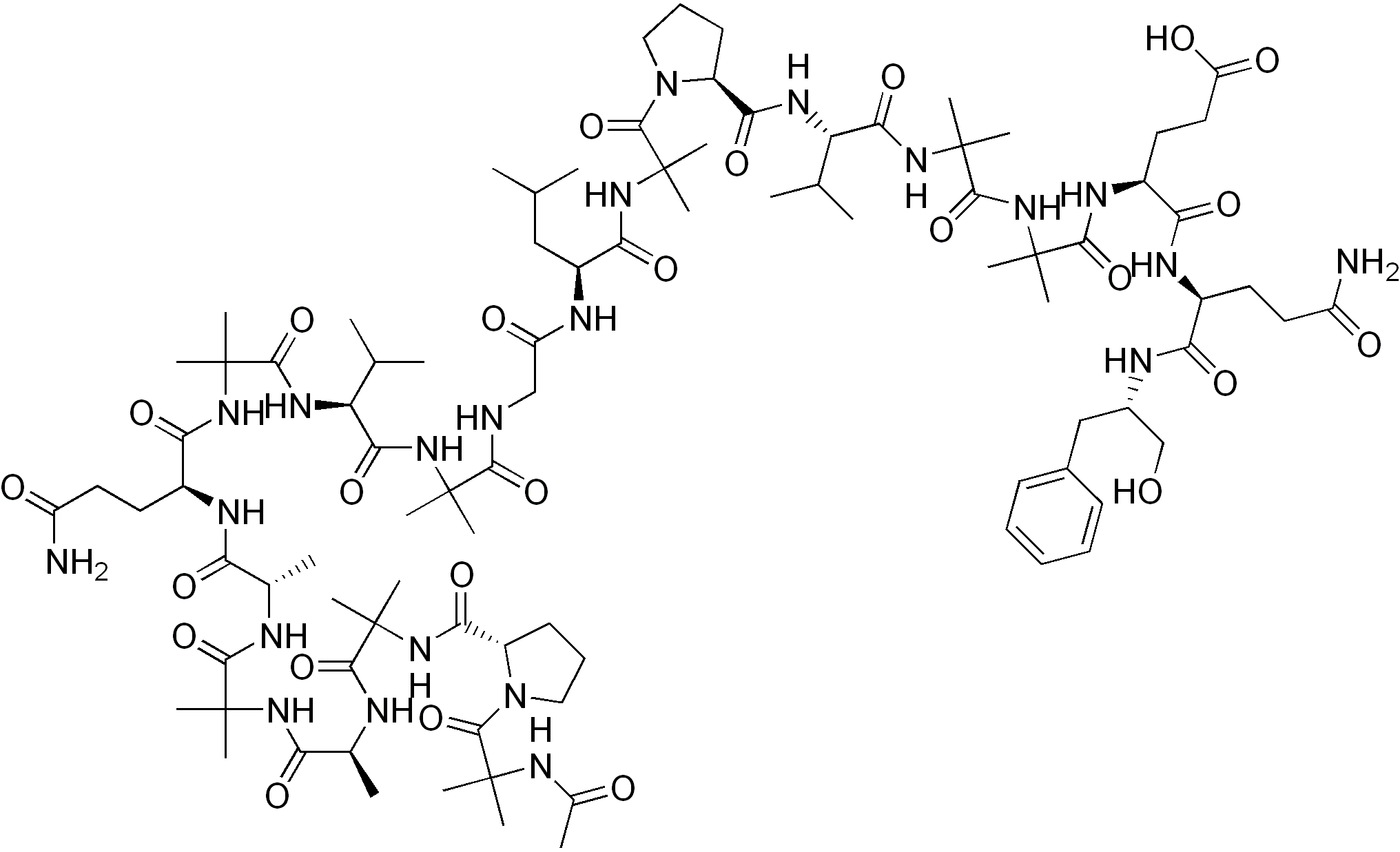

Names
- IUPAC name N-acetyl-2-methylalanyl-L-prolyl-2-methylalanyl-L-alanyl-2-methylalanyl-L-alanyl-L-glutaminyl-2-methylalanyl-L-valyl-2-methylalanylglycyl-L-leucyl-2-methylalanyl-L-prolyl-L-valyl-2-methylalanyl-2-methylalanyl-L-α-glutamyl-N^{1}-[(1S)-1-benzyl-2-hydroxyethyl]-L-glutamamide

Identifiers
CAS Number	27061-78-5
3D model (JSmol)	Interactive image; Interactive image
ChEMBL	ChEMBL438243
ChemSpider	17288702
ECHA InfoCard	100.121.626
PubChem CID	16132042
UNII	0LT1I1B7S8
CompTox Dashboard (EPA)	DTXSID40893675
- InChI: InChI=1S/C92H150N22O25/c1-47(2)43-58(72(127)108-92(24,25)84(139)113-41-29-33-59(113)73(128)103-65(48(3)4)75(130)111-90(20,21)82(137)112-89(18,19)80(135)102-56(37-40-64(120)121)70(125)101-55(35-38-61(93)117)69(124)98-54(46-115)44-53-31-27-26-28-32-53)99-63(119)45-95-77(132)85(10,11)110-76(131)66(49(5)6)104-81(136)88(16,17)107-71(126)57(36-39-62(94)118)100-67(122)50(7)96-78(133)86(12,13)106-68(123)51(8)97-79(134)87(14,15)109-74(129)60-34-30-42-114(60)83(138)91(22,23)105-52(9)116/h26-28,31-32,47-51,54-60,65-66,115H,29-30,33-46H2,1-25H3,(H2,93,117)(H2,94,118)(H,95,132)(H,96,133)(H,97,134)(H,98,124)(H,99,119)(H,100,122)(H,101,125)(H,102,135)(H,103,128)(H,104,136)(H,105,116)(H,106,123)(H,107,126)(H,108,127)(H,109,129)(H,110,131)(H,111,130)(H,112,137)(H,120,121)/t50-,51-,54-,55-,56-,57-,58-,59-,60-,65-,66-/m0/s1 Key: LGHSQOCGTJHDIL-UTXLBGCNSA-N; InChI=1/C92H150N22O25/c1-47(2)43-58(72(127)108-92(24,25)84(139)113-41-29-33-59(113)73(128)103-65(48(3)4)75(130)111-90(20,21)82(137)112-89(18,19)80(135)102-56(37-40-64(120)121)70(125)101-55(35-38-61(93)117)69(124)98-54(46-115)44-53-31-27-26-28-32-53)99-63(119)45-95-77(132)85(10,11)110-76(131)66(49(5)6)104-81(136)88(16,17)107-71(126)57(36-39-62(94)118)100-67(122)50(7)96-78(133)86(12,13)106-68(123)51(8)97-79(134)87(14,15)109-74(129)60-34-30-42-114(60)83(138)91(22,23)105-52(9)116/h26-28,31-32,47-51,54-60,65-66,115H,29-30,33-46H2,1-25H3,(H2,93,117)(H2,94,118)(H,95,132)(H,96,133)(H,97,134)(H,98,124)(H,99,119)(H,100,122)(H,101,125)(H,102,135)(H,103,128)(H,104,136)(H,105,116)(H,106,123)(H,107,126)(H,108,127)(H,109,129)(H,110,131)(H,111,130)(H,112,137)(H,120,121)/t50-,51-,54-,55-,56-,57-,58-,59-,60-,65-,66-/m0/s1 Key: LGHSQOCGTJHDIL-UTXLBGCNBC
- SMILES: CC(C)C[C@@H](C(=O)NC(C)(C)C(=O)N1CCC[C@H]1C(=O)N[C@@H](C(C)C)C(=O)NC(C)(C)C(=O)NC(C)(C)C(=O)N[C@@H](CCC(=O)O)C(=O)N[C@@H](CCC(=O)N)C(=O)N[C@@H](CC2=CC=CC=C2)CO)NC(=O)CNC(=O)C(C)(C)NC(=O)[C@H](C(C)C)NC(=O)C(C)(C)NC(=O)[C@H](CCC(=O)N)NC(=O)[C@H](C)NC(=O)C(C)(C)NC(=O)[C@H](C)NC(=O)C(C)(C)NC(=O)[C@@H]3CCCN3C(=O)C(C)(C)NC(=O)C; CC(C)CC(C(=O)NC(C)(C)C(=O)N1CCCC1C(=O)NC(C(C)C)C(=O)NC(C)(C)C(=O)NC(C)(C)C(=O)NC(CCC(=O)O)C(=O)NC(CCC(=O)N)C(=O)NC(Cc2ccccc2)CO)NC(=O)CNC(=O)C(C)(C)NC(=O)C(C(C)C)NC(=O)C(C)(C)NC(=O)C(CCC(=O)N)NC(=O)C(C)NC(=O)C(C)(C)NC(=O)C(C)NC(=O)C(C)(C)NC(=O)C3CCCN3C(=O)C(C)(C)NC(=O)C

Properties
Chemical formula	C_{92}H_{150}N_{22}O_{25}
Molar mass	1964.31 g/mol
Appearance	Off white solid
Melting point	255 to 270 °C (491 to 518 °F; 528 to 543 K)
Solubility in water	Insoluble
Solubility in DMSO, methanol, ethanol	Soluble
- Except where otherwise noted, data are given for materials in their standard state (at 25 °C [77 °F], 100 kPa). verify (what is ?) Infobox references

Alamethicin is a channel-forming peptide antibiotic, produced by the fungus Trichoderma viride. It belongs to peptaibol peptides which contain the non-proteinogenic amino acid residue Aib (2-aminoisobutyric acid). This residue strongly induces formation of alpha-helical structure. The peptide sequence is

Ac-Aib-Pro-Aib-Ala-Aib-Ala-Gln-Aib-Val-Aib-Gly-Leu-Aib-Pro-Val-Aib-Aib-Glu-Gln-Phl

where Ac = acetyl, Phl = phenylalaninol, and Aib = 2-Aminoisobutyric acid.

In cell membranes, it forms voltage-dependent ion channels by aggregation of four to six molecules.

== Biosynthesis ==
Alamethicin biosynthesis is hypothesized to be catalyzed by alamethicin synthase, a Nonribosomal peptide synthase (NRPS) first isolated in 1975. Although there are several sequences of the alamethicin peptide accepted, evidence suggests these all follow the general NRPS mechanism with small variations at select amino acids. Beginning with the acylation of the N terminal of the first aminoisobutiric acid on the ALM synthase enzyme by Acetyl-CoA, this is followed by the sequential condensation of amino acids by each modular unit of the synthetase. Amino acids are initially adenylated by an “adenylylation” (A) domain before being attached by a thioester bond to an Acyl Carrier Protein-like Peptidyl carrier protein. The growing chain is attached to the amino acid bearing PCP by the "condensation" (C) domain, followed by another round of the same reactions by the next module.

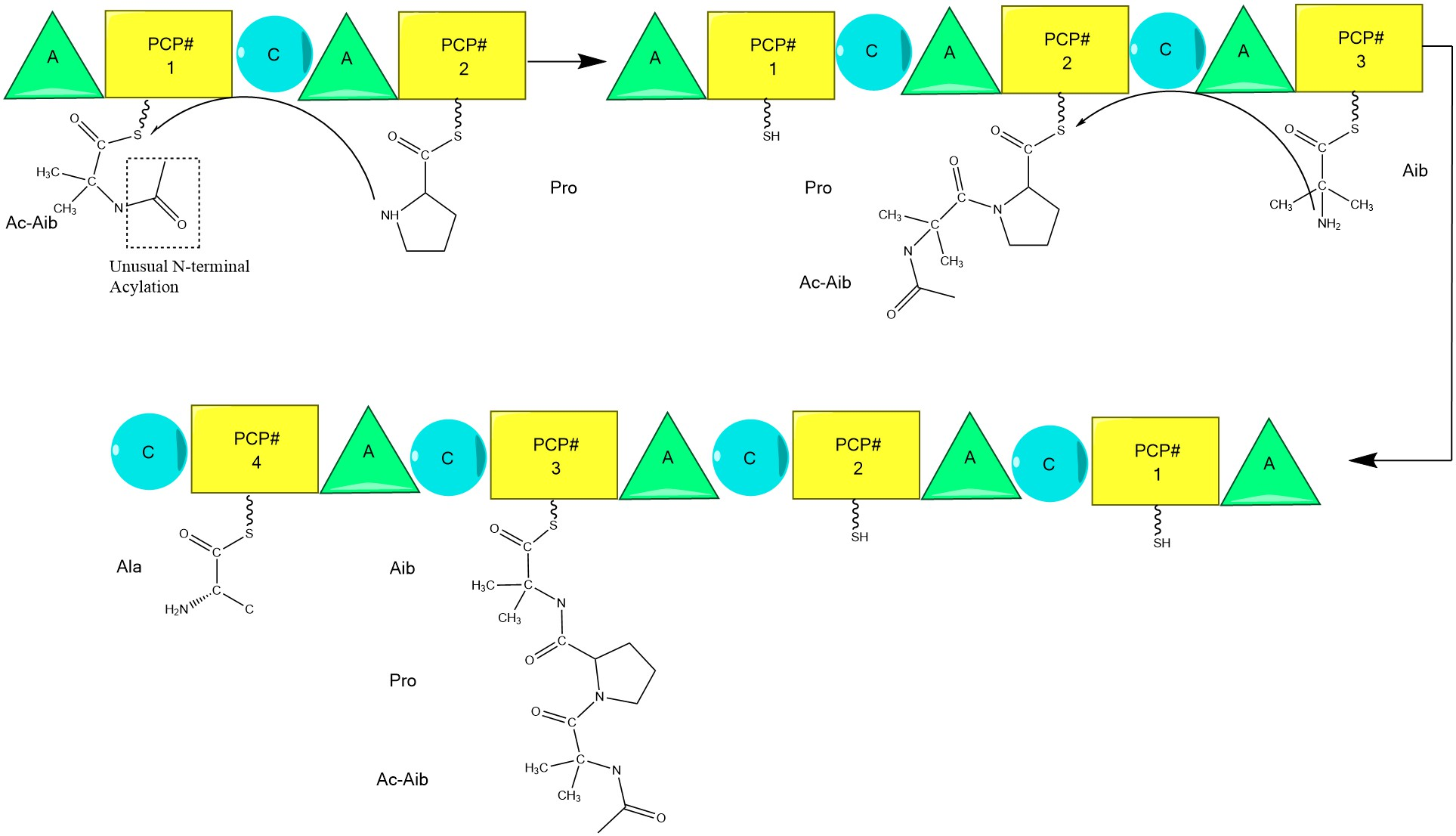
The general mechanism of NRPS synthesis in alamethicin, showing the condensation of amino acid substrates from module to module. Ac=Acetyl Aib=aminoisobutyric acid. Module components: A= Adenylylation PCP= Peptidyl Carrier Protein C=Condensation

Assembly is completed by the addition of phenylalaninol, an unusual amino acid-like substrate. Following addition of phenylalaninol the completed peptide chain is cleaved by the thioesterase domain, cleaving the thioester bond and leaving an alcohol.

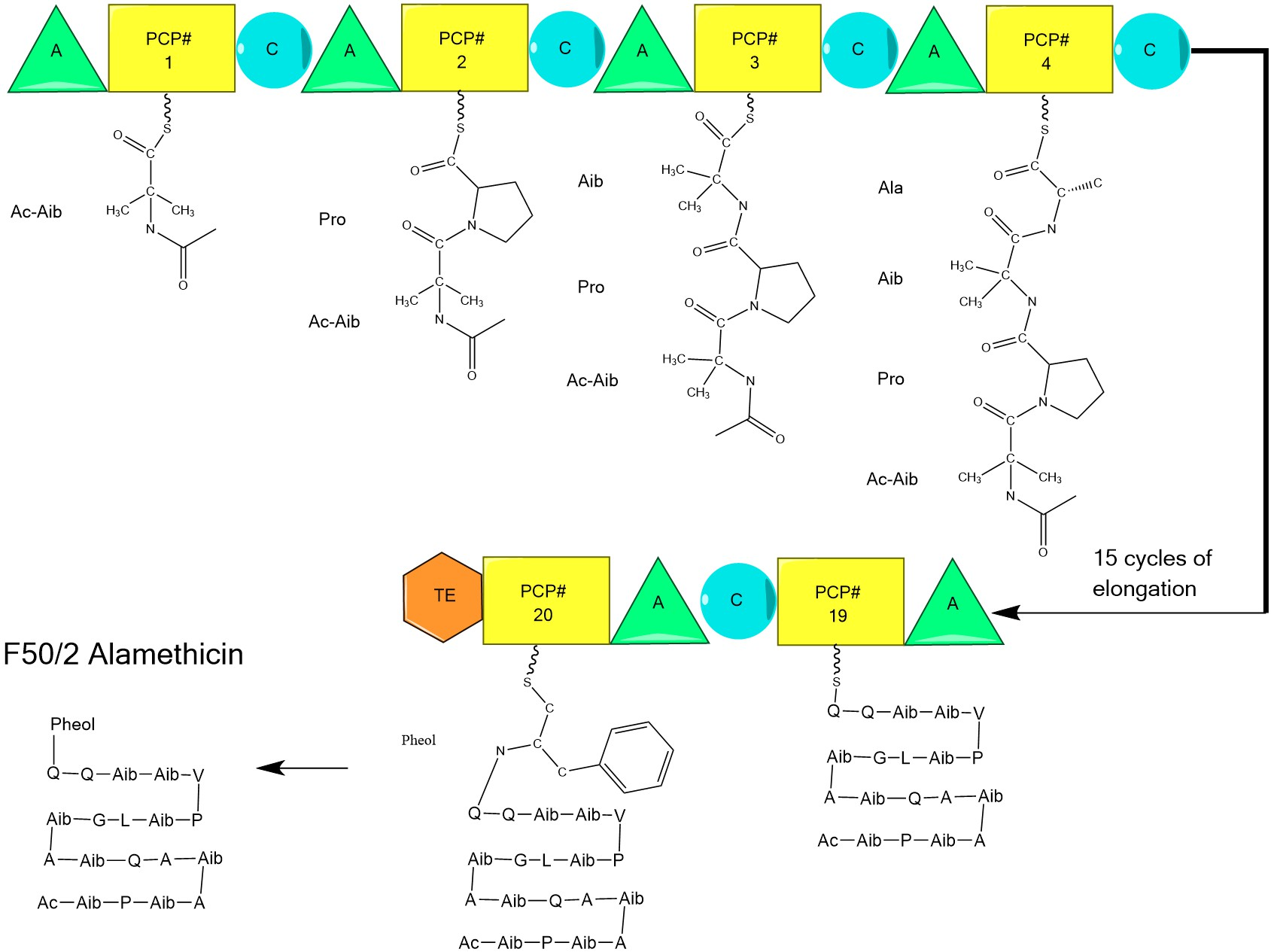
A diagram of the individual modules and elongation of alamethicin biosynthesis. The growing peptide chain is shown for each module, ending in the cleavage of the thioester and generation of linear alamethicin. Ac=Acetyl Aib=Aminoisobutyric acid Pheol=Phenylalaninol. Module components: A=Adenylylation PCP= Peptidyl Carrier Protein C=Condensation
