= STEAP3 =

Protein-coding gene in the species Homo sapiens

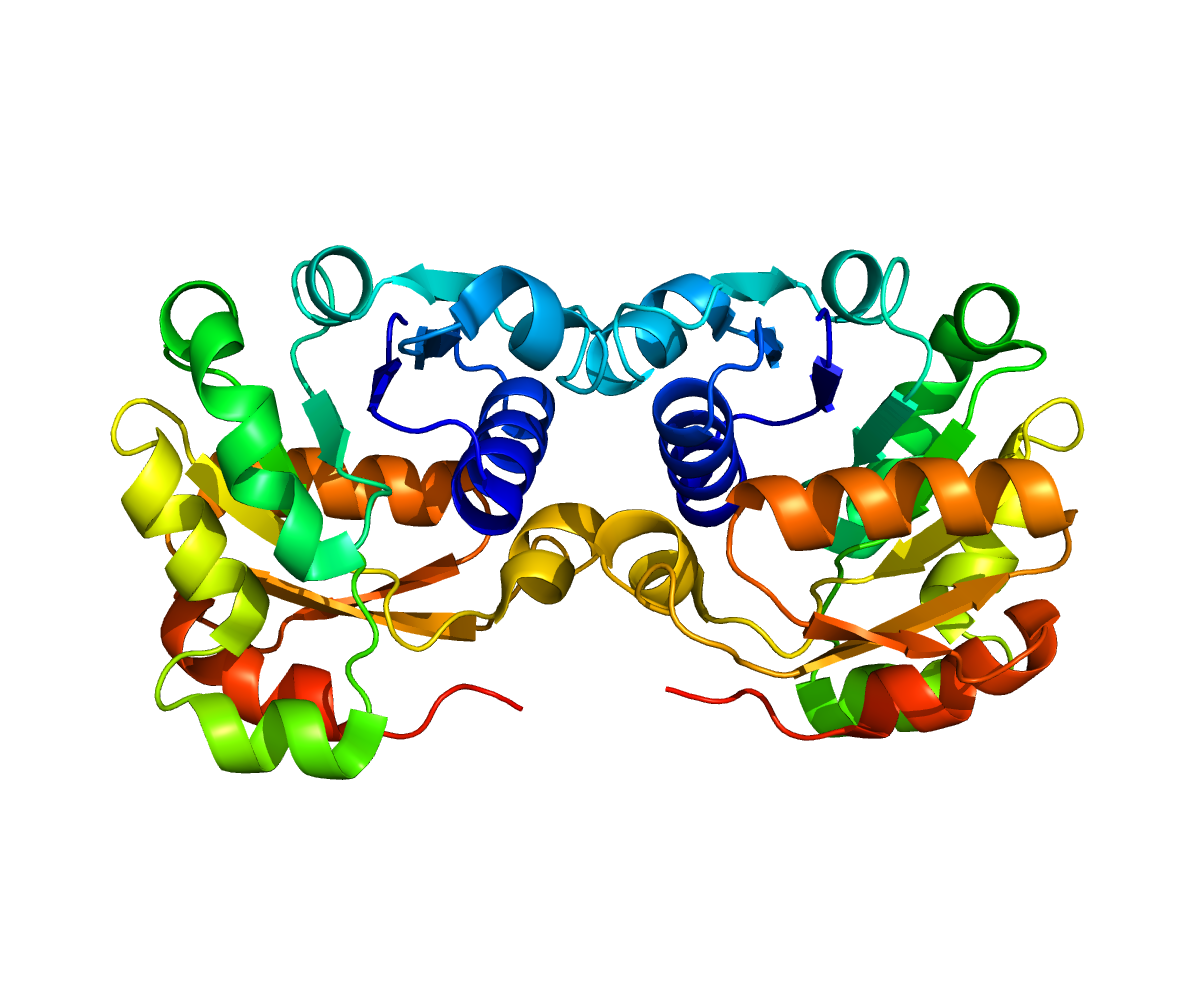
Available structures
PDB	Ortholog search: PDBe RCSB
PDB	List of PDB id codes 2VNS, 2VQ3

Identifiers
- Aliases: STEAP3, AHMIO2, STMP3, TSAP6, dudlin-2, dudulin-2, pHyde, STEAP3 metalloreductase
- External IDs: OMIM: 609671; MGI: 1915678; HomoloGene: 10084; GeneCards: STEAP3; OMA:STEAP3 - orthologs

Gene location (Human)
Chr.	Chromosome 2 (human)
Band	2q14.2	Start	119,223,831 bp
Band	2q14.2	End	119,265,652 bp

Gene location (Mouse)
Chr.	Chromosome 1 (mouse)
Band	1|1 E2.3	Start	120,118,487 bp
Band	1|1 E2.3	End	120,200,435 bp
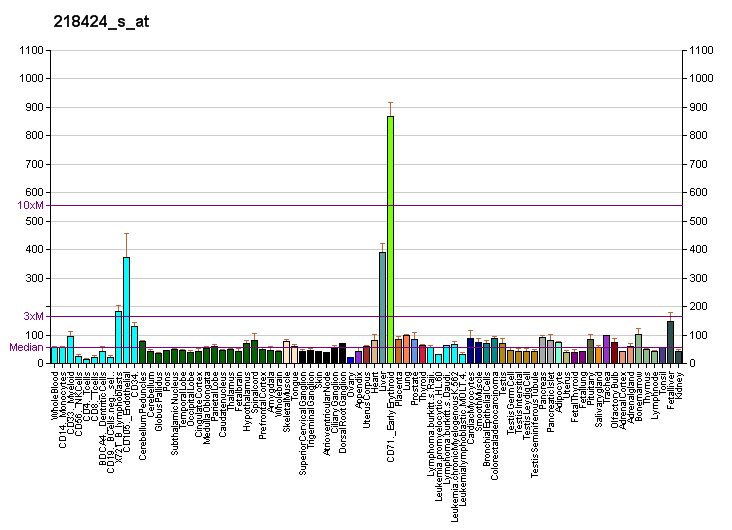
RNA expression pattern
Bgee	Human / Mouse (ortholog); Top expressed in: right lobe of liver; spinal ganglia; olfactory zone of nasal mucosa; epithelium of bronchus; bronchial epithelial cell; lactiferous duct; trigeminal ganglion; triceps brachii muscle; biceps brachii; muscle of trunk / Top expressed in: lumbar spinal ganglion; lip; muscle of thigh; aortic valve; facial skeleton; membranous bone; ascending aorta; Dermatocranium; morula; fetal liver hematopoietic progenitor cell; More reference expression data
BioGPS	More reference expression data
Gene ontology
Molecular function	oxidoreductase activity; protein binding; ferric-chelate reductase (NADPH) activity; metal ion binding; cupric reductase activity; oxidoreductase activity, acting on metal ions, NAD or NADP as acceptor; identical protein binding
Cellular component	integral component of membrane; multivesicular body; endosome; endosome membrane; membrane; integral component of plasma membrane; cytoplasm; plasma membrane
Biological process	apoptotic process; protein secretion; cell cycle; iron ion homeostasis; copper ion import; ion transport; transferrin transport; regulation of apoptotic process; iron ion import across cell outer membrane
Sources:Amigo / QuickGO
Orthologs
Species	Human	Mouse
Entrez	55240	68428
Ensembl	ENSG00000115107	ENSMUSG00000026389
UniProt	Q658P3	Q8CI59
RefSeq (mRNA)	NM_001008410; NM_018234; NM_138637; NM_182915	NM_001085409; NM_133186; NM_001379354; NM_001379355
RefSeq (protein)	NP_001008410; NP_060704; NP_619543; NP_878919	NP_001078878; NP_573449; NP_001366283; NP_001366284
Location (UCSC)	Chr 2: 119.22 – 119.27 Mb	Chr 1: 120.12 – 120.2 Mb
PubMed search
- Wikidata
View/Edit Human	View/Edit Mouse

Metalloreductase STEAP3 is an enzyme that in humans is encoded by the STEAP3 gene.

STEAP3 is a metalloreductase, capable of converting iron from an insoluble ferric (Fe^{3+}) to a soluble ferrous (Fe^{2+}) form.

STEAP3 and other STEAP protein, with the exception of STEAP1, are predicted to contain a Di-nucleotide binding domain (Rossmann Fold). This has been shown using X-ray crystallography in the cases of STEAP3 and STEAP4 (PDB: 2VNS, 2VQ3 and 2YJZ).

== Interactions ==
STEAP3 has been shown to interact with BNIP3L and PKMYT1.
