= HrpZ family =

Cation channel family

The Pseudomonas syringae HrpZ cation channel family or HrpZ family is a member of the RTX-toxin superfamily. The Harpin-PSS (HrpZ) protein is secreted by Pseudomonas syringae via the Hrp secretion system (IIISP) and elicits a hypersensitive response (HR) in non-host plants upon infection and pathogenicity in hosts. It contains several repetitive regions and exhibits two extended (20 residue) regions of moderate hydrophobicity that might serve as α-helical TMSs. The HrpZ cation channel is predicted to be largely of α-structure. HrpZ – a harpin – is a highly thermostable protein that exhibits multifunctional abilities, e.g., it elicits the hypersensitive response (HR), enhances plant growth, acts as a virulence factor, and forms pores in plant plasma membranes as well as artificial membranes. Homologues are not found in organisms other than P. syringae.

== Function ==
When inserted into liposomes and synthetic bilayers at low concentrations (2 nM), it provokes a cation-selective ion current with large unitary conductance. Chloride is not transported. It has been hypothesized that such channels could allow nutrient release or delivery of virulence factors during bacterial colonization of host plants. The leucine-zipper-like motifs may take part in the formation of oligomeric aggregates, and oligomerization could be related to HR elicitation.

=== Transport reaction ===
The generalized transport reaction thought to be catalyzed by HrpZ is:

Small molecules (in) → Small molecules (out)
