= CYB561 =

Protein-coding gene in humans

Identifiers
- Aliases: CYB561, cytochrome b561, CYB561A1, FRRS2, ORTHYP2
- External IDs: OMIM: 600019; MGI: 103253; GeneCards: CYB561
Enzyme activity
EC #	BRENDA	ExPASy	KEGG	MetaCyc
7.2.1.3	↗	↗	↗	↗

Gene location (Human)
Chr.	Chromosome 17 (human)
Band	17q23.3	Start	63,432,304 bp
Band	17q23.3	End	63,446,354 bp

Gene location (Mouse)
Chr.	Chromosome 11 (mouse)
Band	11 E1|11 68.81 cM	Start	105,824,528 bp
Band	11 E1|11 68.81 cM	End	105,844,162 bp
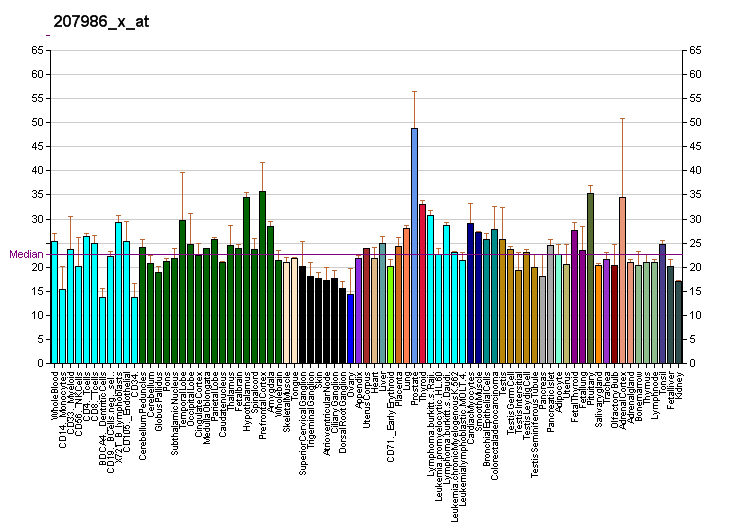

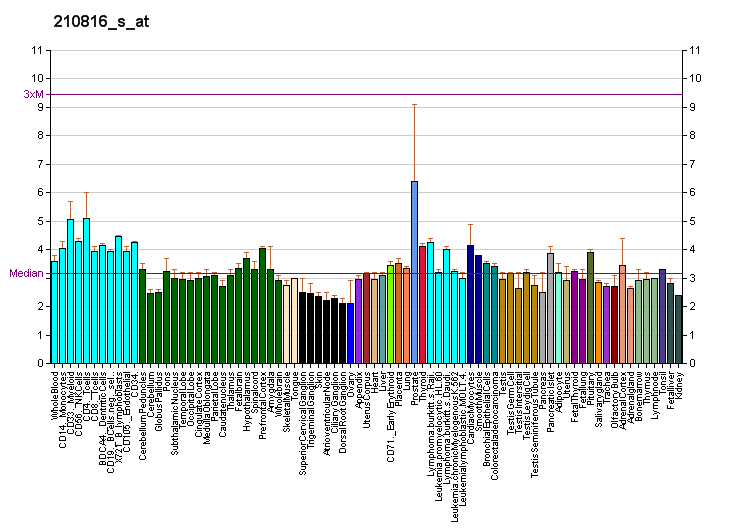

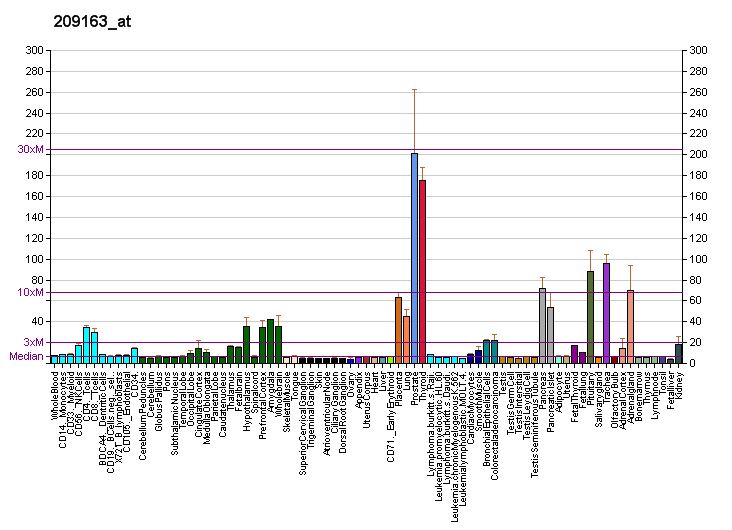
RNA expression pattern
Bgee	Human / Mouse (ortholog); Top expressed in: right uterine tube; body of pancreas; trachea; epithelium of bronchus; bronchial epithelial cell; pituitary gland; olfactory zone of nasal mucosa; anterior pituitary; pylorus; minor salivary glands / Top expressed in: choroid plexus of fourth ventricle; superior cervical ganglion; Epithelium of choroid plexus; parotid gland; saccule; adrenal gland; lacrimal gland; carotid body; olfactory epithelium; facial motor nucleus; More reference expression data
BioGPS	More reference expression data
Gene ontology
Molecular function	oxidoreductase activity; ferric-chelate reductase activity; protein binding; metal ion binding
Cellular component	integral component of membrane; membrane; lysosomal membrane
Biological process	electron transport chain
Sources:Amigo / QuickGO
Orthologs
Databases	NCBI: entry; OMA: entry
Species	Human	Mouse
Entrez	1534	13056
Ensembl	ENSG00000008283	ENSMUSG00000019590
UniProt	P49447	Q60720
RefSeq (mRNA)	NM_001017916; NM_001017917; NM_001017918; NM_001915; NM_001330421	NM_007805; NM_001356374
RefSeq (protein)	NP_001017916; NP_001017917; NP_001317350; NP_001906	NP_031831; NP_001343303
Location (UCSC)	Chr 17: 63.43 – 63.45 Mb	Chr 11: 105.82 – 105.84 Mb
PubMed search
- Wikidata
View/Edit Human	View/Edit Mouse

Cytochrome b561 is an enzyme that in humans is encoded by the CYB561 gene. This enzyme is predicted to reduce iron ions from Fe^{3+} to Fe^{2+}, and may be involved in iron transport. It is a transmembrane protein located in the lipid membrane of certain secretory vesicles, and is a member of the larger cytochrome b561 family of proteins.
