= YedZ family =

Family of transport proteins

YedZ (TC# 5.B.7) of E. coli has been examined topologically and has 6 transmembrane segments (TMSs) with both the N- and C-termini localized to the cytoplasm. von Rozycki et al. 2004 identified homologues of YedZ in bacteria and animals. YedZ homologues exhibit conserved histidyl residues in their transmembrane domains that may function in heme binding. Some of the homologues encoded in the genomes of various bacteria have YedZ domains fused to transport, electron transfer and biogenesis proteins. One of the animal homologues is the 6 TMS epithelial plasma membrane antigen of the prostate (STAMP1) that is over-expressed in prostate cancer. Some animal homologues have YedZ domains fused C-terminal to homologues of NADP oxidoreductases.

YedZ homologues arose by intragenic triplication of a 2 TMS-encoding element. They exhibit statistically significant sequence similarity to two families of putative heme export systems and one family of cytochrome-containing electron carriers and have biogenesis. YedZ homologues can function as heme-binding proteins that facilitate or regulate oxidoreduction, transmembrane electron flow and transport. Homologues of YedZ are found in a variety of bacteria, including magnetotactic bacteria and cyanobacteria where YedZ domains are fused C-terminal to magnetosome transporters of the MFS superfamily (TC# 2.A.1) and to electron carriers of the DsbD family (TC# 5.A.1), respectively.

YedZ homologues are found in animals where one includes a human 6 TMS epithelial plasma membrane antigen that is expressed at high levels in prostate cancer cells. Even more distant homologues may include the transmembrane domain within members of the gp91^{phox}NADPH oxidase associated cytochrome b_{558} (CytB) family (TC #5.B.2). Heme-containing transmembrane ferric reductase domains (FRD) are found in both bacterial and eukaryotic proteins including ferric reductases (FRE), and NADPH oxidases (NOX). Bacteria contain FRD proteins consisting only of a ferric reductase domain, such as YedZ and short FRE proteins. Full length FRE and NOX enzymes are mostly found in eukaryotes and possess a dehydrogenase domain, allowing them to catalyze electron transfer from cytosolic NADPH to extracellular metal ions (FRE) or oxygen (NOX). Metazoa possess YedZ-related STEAP proteins. Phylogenetic analyses suggests that FRE enzymes appeared early in evolution, followed by a transition towards EF-hand containing NOX enzymes (NOX5- and DUOX-like). NOX enzymes are distinguished from FRE enzymes through a four amino acid motif spanning from transmembrane domain 3 (TM3) to TM4, and YedZ/STEAP proteins are identified by the replacement of the first canonical heme-spanning histidine by a highly conserved arginine.

Six-transmembrane epithelial antigen of the prostate 3 (Steap3) is the major ferric reductase in developing erythrocytes. Steap family proteins are defined by a shared transmembrane domain that in Steap3 has been shown to function as a transmembrane electron shuttle, moving cytoplasmic electrons derived from NADPH across the lipid bilayer to the extracellular face where they are used to reduce Fe^{3+} to Fe^{2+} and potentially Cu^{2+} to Cu^{1+}. High affinity FAD and iron binding sites and a single b-type heme binding site is present in the Steap3 transmembrane domain. Steap3 is functional as a homodimer and utilizes an intrasubunit electron transfer pathway through the single heme moiety rather than an intersubunit electron pathway through a potential domain-swapped dimer. The sequence motifs in the transmembrane domain that are associated with the FAD and metal binding sites are not only present in Steap2 and Steap4 but also in Steap1 which lacks the N-terminal oxidoreductase domain, suggesting that Steap1 harbors latent oxidoreductase activity.
