= RTX toxin =

Group of exotoxins from bacteria

The RTX toxin superfamily is a group of cytolysins and cytotoxins produced by bacteria. There are over 1000 known members with a variety of functions. The RTX family is defined by two common features: characteristic repeats in the toxin protein sequences, and extracellular secretion by the type I secretion systems (T1SS). The name RTX (repeats in toxin) refers to the glycine and aspartate-rich repeats located at the C-terminus of the toxin proteins, which facilitate export by a dedicated T1SS encoded within the rtx operon.

== Structure and function ==
RTX proteins range from 40 to over 600 kDa in size and all contain C-terminally located glycine and aspartate-rich repeat sequences of nine amino acids. The repeats contain the common sequence structure [GGXGXDX[L/I/V/W/Y/F]X], (where X represents any amino acid), but the number of repeats varies within RTX protein family members. These consensus regions function as sites for Ca^{2+} binding, which facilitate folding of the RTX protein following export via an ATP-mediated type 1 secretion system (T1SS). Most of the T1SS proteins are encoded within the rtx operon. The T1SS proteins form a continuous channel spanning both the inner membrane (IM) and outer membrane (OM) of the bacterial cell, preventing RTX toxin exposure to the periplasmic space (between the IM and OM). Type 1 secretion system components include: an ABC transporter (TC# 3.A.1), a membrane fusion protein (MFP; TC# 8.A.1), and an outer membrane protein (OMF; TC# 1.B.17). The OMF is often encoded outside of the rtx operon as it may have multiple functions within the cell. In Escherichia coli, Pasteurella haemolytica, and Vibrio cholerae, TolC functions as the OMP in T1SS RTX toxin export. In each case, the tolC gene is located outside the rtx operon and encodes a conserved multifunctional protein. During transport, the T1SS recognizes the C-terminal repeats of the RTX toxin, and the C-terminus is transferred first through the channel.

The general rtx gene cluster encodes three protein types: the RTX toxin, an RTX activating acyltransferase, and T1SS proteins. The toxin is inactive until post-translational modification by the cis-encoded RTX toxin activator, which typically occurs within the target cell. The RTX-activating acyltransferase catalyzes the attachment of acyl-linked fatty acids to internally located lysine residues within the RTX toxin. This modification is required in all RTX toxins; however, its exact function in RTX toxicity is not understood. Members of the RTX toxin family display a large range of functions, and typically multiple functional domains. Pore-formation is the only known shared function in RTX cytotoxins, and pores are typically cation-selective allowing for an influx of Ca^{2+} in target cells.

Members of the RTX superfamily (RTX (TC# 1.C.11); HrpZ (TC# 1.C.56) and CCT (TC# 1.C.57)) contain repeat sequences that are also found in autotransporters (e.g., 1.B.12.10.1 and 1.B.40.1.2) as well as TolA (2.C.1.2.1). These domains probably mediate protein-protein interactions.

== Families ==
The Transporter Classification Database divides the RTX-toxin superfamily into 3 different families of homologues based on bioinformatic and phylogenetic analysis:

- 1.C.11 – The pore-forming RTX toxin (RTX-toxin) family
- 1.C.56 – The Pseudomonas syringae HrpZ cation channel (HrpZ) family
- 1.C.57 – The clostridial cytotoxin (CCT) family

RTX toxins were originally divided into hemolysins and leukotoxins. However, evidence has shown leukotoxic activity in the hemolysins, leading to reclassification of RTX toxin subgroups into two families: pore-forming leukotoxins) and the MARTX toxins (multifunctional autoprocessing RTX toxins). MARTX toxins are much larger than RTX toxins and are exported by modified type 1 secretion systems containing an additional ABC-transporter.

=== Pore-forming RTX toxin (RTX-toxin) family ===
The RTX-toxin family (subfamily of RTX-toxin superfamily) is a large family of multidomain Gram-negative bacterial pore-forming exotoxins. They are secreted from the bacteria, and after processing, they insert into the membranes of animal cells. They exert both cell type- and species-specific effects (e.g., the leukotoxin of M. haemolytica interacts only with alveolar macrophages, neutrophils, and lymphocytes of ruminants and is believed to promote bacterial proliferation by killing or incapacitating these cells). These toxins recognize protein receptors such as the β_{2}-integrins, form pores at high concentrations, and cause cell rupture by mechanisms not well understood. Three transmembrane domains are believed to be involved in pore formation which in the E. coli HlyA protein are at residues 299–319, 361–381 and 383–403. However, at low, sublytic concentrations, leukotoxin causes activation of neutrophils, production of inflammatory cytokines, degranulation, generation of oxygen-derived free radicals, and morphologic changes consistent with apoptosis.

The C-terminal domain of the adenylate cyclase toxin (ACT or CyaA) of Bordetella pertussis forms a small cation-selective channel, disrupting the permeability barrier. This channel probably does not deliver the N-terminal adenylate cyclase to the host cell cytoplasm. However, mutations in residues in an amphipathic α-helix (Glu509 and Glu516) in the pore-forming domain block adenylate cyclase translocation and modulate as well the cation selectivity of the membrane channel, as translocation and pore-forming activities employ the same structural elements of the toxin molecule in an alternative and mutually independent way. ACT uses a CD11b/CD18 (complement receptor 3) beta2 integrin receptor on myeloid phagocytic cells but with low efficacy it can penetrate also cells lacking this receptor or insert into liposomes. Phosphatidylethanolamine and cholesterol stimulate ACT insertion. ACT also promotes lipid flip-flop suggesting that ACT forms trans-bilayer nonlamellar lipid structures when it inserts into the membrane. CyaA may form two different types of pore-like structures, dependent on the orientation of the membrane potential and the pH.

==== Transport reaction ====
The generalized transport reaction proposed for members of the RTX-toxin family is:

small molecules (in) → small molecules (out).

== Examples ==
RTX toxins are produced by a variety of gram-negative bacteria. RTX toxin production and rtx genes have been discovered in many bacterial genera including Escherichia, Proteus, and Bordetella. Members of the family Pasteurellaceae also produce RTX toxins. The genus Vibrio, which includes V. cholerae and V. vulnificus, produces MARTX toxins, another class of RTX proteins.

=== In Escherichia coli ===
RTX toxins have been found in numerous strains of pathogenic E. coli. The prototypical RTX toxin, α-haemolysin (HlyA), is a common virulence factor in uropathogenic E. coli (UPEC), the leading cause of urinary tract infections. The hly operon encodes the RTX toxin (HlyA), the HlyA activation protein HlyC (an acyltransferase, and two proteins of the T1SS machinery. The Hyl T1SS includes the ABC transporter HlyB, the membrane fusion protein HlyD, and the outer membrane protein TolC. While hlyB and hlyD genes are located within the hly operon, TolC is a multifunctional protein encoded outside the hly operon.

Enterohaemorrhagic Escherichia coli (EHEC) also produces an RTX toxin. EHEC haemolysin (EHEC-Hly) was discovered in the EHEC serotype O157:H7. The EHEC-Hly operon contains four E. coli hly homologs: EHEC-hlyA, EHEC-hlyC, EHEC-hlyB, and EHEC-hlyD. Shiga toxins (Stx) are the primary virulence factors in enterohaemorrhagic E. coli but EHEC produces several other virulence factors capable of damaging the vascular endothelium in EHEC infections. EHEC-Hly is expressed in numerous EHEC serogroups known to cause severe infections in humans. EHEC-Hly is transported within EHEC-secreted outer membrane vesicles (OMVs) in vitro. This mode of transport increases virulence by aiding in EHEC-Hly delivery to target cells.

=== In Vibrio cholerae ===
RTX toxins in Vibrio bacteria represent an early discovery in RTX toxin research, but were only recently discovered to belong to a separate class of RTX toxins called MARTX toxins. In Vibrio cholerae the martx gene encodes six proteins: the MARTX toxin (RtxA), an acyltransferase (RtxC), a membrane fusion protein (RtxD), two ABC-transporters (RtxB and RtxE), and one protein with unknown function. RtxA is a virulence factor involved in cholera which facilitates colonization of V. cholerae the small intestine. RtxA causes destruction of the actin cytoskeleton in host cells through G-actin modification and destruction of Rho GTPases. The toxin contains four functional domains: an actin cross-linking domain (ACD), a Rho-inactivating domain (RID), a cysteine protease domain (CPD), and an αβ-hydrolase. In V. cholerae infection, the CPD binds to inositol hexakisphosphate (InsP_{6}, Phytic acid) inside eukaryotic host cells. This binding activates the autoproteolytic CPD which cleaves the MARTX protein into smaller independent proteins each containing only one of the effector domains ACD, RID, and αβ-hydrolase. This allows each effector to act independently within the host cell, this increases the effects of RtxA because the ACD and RID function in different locations within the cell. ACD cross-links monomeric G-actin in the host cell cytosol, preventing formation of actin microfilament, a major component of the cytoskeleton. RID inactivates membrane bound Rho-GTPases, which are regulators of cytoskeleton formation.

=== In Bordetella pertussis ===
Adenylate cyclase toxin (ACT or CyaA), is a primary virulence factor in Bordetella pertussis. CyaA is a multifunctional RTX family toxin that targets myeloid phagocytes, impairing the innate immune response and promoting B. pertussis colonization. The cyaA operon encodes the five proteins CyaA (RTX toxin), CyaC (CyaA activation protein), and the three T1SS proteins: CyaB (an ABC transporter) CyaD (a membrane fusion protein), and CyaE (an outer membrane protein). The CyaA protein contains an adenylate cyclase domain (AC domain) and a hemolytic/cytolytic domain. The hemolytic function forms pores in target cells, while the cell-invasive AC domain translocates across cellular membrane into cell cytosol. CyaA binds the α_{M}β_{2} integrin, inserts itself into the cell membrane and opens a transient path for influx of Ca^{2+} ions that activate calpain. This enables repositioning of the CyaA toxin within the cell membrane into membrane microdomains enriched with cholesterol (lipid rafts) and translocation of the AC domain across the membrane into cell cytosol is completed. Once the AC domain is internalized into cytosol it is activated by binding of calmodulin and catalyzes unregulated conversion of cytosolic ATP to cAMP, thus raising it to cytotoxic levels.
