= Uniporter =

Class of membrane transport proteins

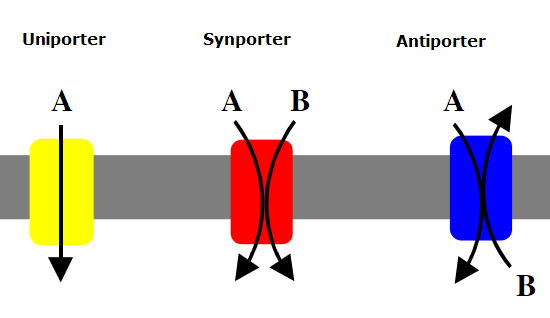
Comparison of transport proteins

Uniporters, also known as solute carriers or facilitated transporters, are a type of membrane transport protein that passively transports solutes (small molecules, ions, or other substances) across a cell membrane. It uses facilitated diffusion for the movement of solutes down their concentration gradient from an area of high concentration to an area of low concentration. Unlike active transport, it does not require energy in the form of ATP to function. Uniporters are specialized to carry one specific ion or molecule and can be categorized as either channels or carriers. Facilitated diffusion may occur through three mechanisms: uniport, symport, or antiport. The difference between each mechanism depends on the direction of transport, in which uniport is the only transport not coupled to the transport of another solute.

Uniporter carrier proteins work by binding to one molecule or substrate at a time. Uniporter channels open in response to a stimulus and allow the free flow of specific molecules.

There are several ways in which the opening of uniporter channels may be regulated:

1. Voltage – Regulated by the difference in voltage across the membrane
2. Stress – Regulated by physical pressure on the transporter (as in the cochlea of the ear)
3. Ligand – Regulated by the binding of a ligand to either the intracellular or extracellular side of the cell

Uniporters are found in mitochondria, plasma membranes and neurons.The uniporter in the mitochondria is responsible for calcium uptake. The calcium channels are used for cell signaling and triggering apoptosis. The calcium uniporter transports calcium across the inner mitochondrial membrane and is activated when calcium rises above a certain concentration. The amino acid transporters function in transporting neutral amino acids for neurotransmitter production in brain cells. Voltage-gated potassium channels are also uniporters found in neurons and are essential for action potentials. This channel is activated by a voltage gradient created by sodium-potassium pumps. When the membrane reaches a certain voltage, the channels open, which depolarizes the membrane, leading to an action potential being sent down the membrane. Glucose transporters are found in the plasma membrane and play a role in transporting glucose. They help to bring glucose from the blood or extracellular space into cells usually to be utilized for metabolic processes in generating energy.

Uniporters are essential for certain physiological processes in cells, such as nutrient uptake, waste removal, and maintenance of ionic balance.

== Discovery ==
Facilitated diffusion using transport proteins

Early research in the 19th and 20th centuries on osmosis and diffusion provided the foundation for understanding the passive movement of molecules across cell membranes.

In 1855, the physiologist Adolf Fick was the first to define osmosis and simple diffusion as the tendency for solutes to move from a region of higher concentration to a lower concentration, also very well-known as Fick's Laws of Diffusion. Through the work of Charles Overton in the 1890s, the concept that the biological membrane is semipermeable became important to understanding the regulation of substances in and out of the cells. The discovery of facilitated diffusion by Wittenberg and Scholander suggested that proteins in the cell membrane aid in the transport of molecules. In the 1960s - 1970s, studies on the transport of glucose and other nutrients highlighted the specificity and selectivity of membrane transport proteins.

Technological advancements in biochemistry helped isolate and characterize these proteins from cell membranes. Genetic studies on bacteria and yeast identified genes responsible for encoding transporters. This led to the discovery of glucose transporters (GLUT proteins), with GLUT1 being the first to be characterized. Identification of gene families encoding various transporters, such as solute carrier (SLC) families, also advanced knowledge on uniporters and its functions.

Newer research is focusing on techniques using recombinant DNA technology, electrophysiology and advanced imaging to understand uniporter functions. These experiments are designed to clone and express transporter genes in host cells to further analyze the three-dimensional structure of uniporters, as well as directly observe the movement of ions through proteins in real-time. The discovery of mutations in uniporters has been linked to diseases such as GLUT1 deficiency syndrome, cystic fibrosis, Hartnup disease, primary hyperoxaluria and hypokalemic periodic paralysis.

== Types ==
=== Glucose transporter (GLUTs) ===
The glucose transporter (GLUTs) is a type of uniporter responsible for the facilitated diffusion of glucose molecules across cell membranes.Glucose is a vital energy source for most living cells, however, due to its large size, it cannot freely move through the cell membrane. The glucose transporter is specialized in transporting glucose specifically across the membrane. The GLUT proteins have several types of isoforms, each distributed in different tissues and exhibiting different kinetic properties.

Glucose transporter

GLUTs are integral membrane proteins composed of 12 α-helix membrane spanning regions. The GLUT proteins are encoded by the SLC2 genes and categorized into three classes based on amino acid sequence similarity. Humans have been found to express fourteen GLUT proteins. Class I GLUTs include GLUT1, one of the most studied isoforms, and GLUT2. GLUT1 is found in various tissues like the red blood cells, brain, and blood-brain barrier and is responsible for basal glucose uptake. GLUT2 is predominantly found in the liver, pancreas, and small intestines. It plays an important role in insulin secretion from pancreatic beta cells. Class II includes the GLUT3 and GLUT4. GLUT3, primarily found in the brain, neurons and placenta, has a high affinity for glucose in facilitating glucose uptake into neurons. GLUT4 plays a role in insulin-regulated glucose uptake and is mainly found in insulin-sensitive tissues such as muscle and adipose tissue. Class III includes GLUT5, found in the small intestine, kidney, testes, and skeletal muscle. Unlike the other GLUTs, GLUT5 specifically transports fructose rather than glucose.

Glucose transporters allow glucose molecules to move down their concentration gradient from areas of high glucose concentration to areas of low concentration. This process often involves bringing glucose from the extracellular space or blood into the cell. The concentration gradient set up by glucose concentrations fuels the process without the need for ATP.

When glucose binds to the glucose transporter, the protein channels change shape and undergo a conformational change to transport the glucose across the membrane. Once the glucose unbinds, the protein returns to its original shape. The glucose transporter is essential for carrying out physiological processes that require high energy demands in the brain, muscles, and kidneys by providing an adequate amount of energy substrate for metabolism. Diabetes, an example of a condition that involves glucose metabolism, highlights the importance of the regulation of glucose uptake in disease management.

=== Mitochondrial Ca^{2+} uniporter (MCU) ===
The mitochondrial calcium uniporter (MCU) is a protein complex located in the inner mitochondrial matrix that functions to take up calcium ions (Ca2+) into the matrix from the cytoplasm. The transport of calcium ions is specifically used in cellular function for regulating energy production in the mitochondria, cytosolic calcium signaling, and cell death. The uniporter becomes activated when cytoplasmic levels of calcium rise above 1 uM.

The MCU complex comprises 4 parts: the port-forming subunits, regulatory subunits MICU1 and MICU2, and an auxiliary subunit, EMRE. These subunits work together to regulate the uptake of calcium in the mitochondria. Specifically, the EMRE subunit functions for the transport of calcium, and the MICU subunit functions in tightly regulating the activity of MCU to prevent the overload of calcium concentrations in the cytoplasm. Calcium is fundamental for signaling pathways in cells, as well as for cell death pathways. The function of the mitochondrial uniporter is critical for maintaining cellular homeostasis.

The MICU1 and MICU2 subunits are a heterodimer connected by a disulfide bridge. When there are high levels of cytoplasmic calcium, the MICU1-MICU2 heterodimer undergoes a conformational change. The heterodimer subunits have cooperative activation, which means Ca^{2+} binding to one MICU subunit in the heterodimer induces a conformational change on the other MICU subunits. The uptake of calcium is balanced by the sodium-calcium exchanger.

=== Large neutral amino acid transporter (LAT1) ===
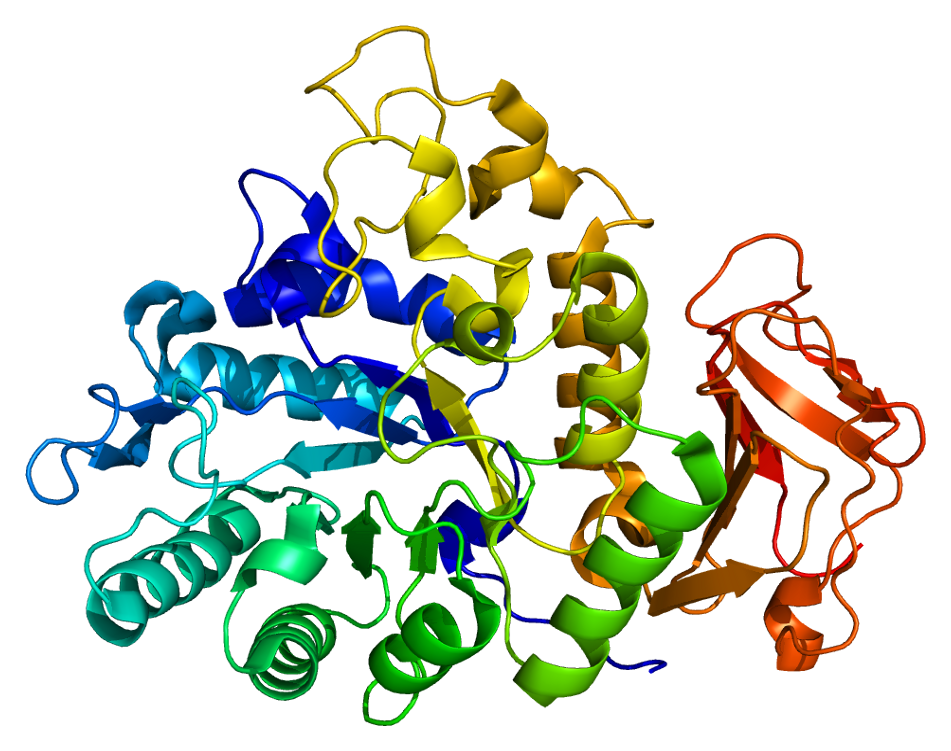
SLC3 protein coding gene for LAT1

The L-type amino acid transporter (LAT1) is a uniporter that mediates the transport of neutral amino acids like L-tryptophan, leucine, histidine, proline, alanine, etc. LAT1 favors the transport of amino acids with large branched or aromatic side chains. The amino acid transporter functions to move essential amino acids into the intestinal epithelium, placenta, and blood-brain barrier for cellular processes such as metabolism and cell signaling. The transporter is of particular significance in the central nervous system as it provides the necessary amino acids for protein synthesis and neurotransmitter production in brain cells. Aromatic amino acids like phenylalanine and tryptophan are precursors for neurotransmitters like dopamine, serotonin, and norepinephrine.

LAT1 is a membrane protein of the SLC7 family of transporters and works in conjunction with the SLC3 family member 4F2hc to form a heterodimeric complex known as the 4F2hc complex. The heterodimer consists of a light chain and a heavy chain covalently bonded by a disulfide bond. The light chain is the one that carries out transport, while the heavy chain is needed to stabilize the dimer.

There is some controversy over whether LAT1 is an uniporter or an antiporter. The transporter has uniporter characteristics of transporting amino acids into cells in a unidirectional manner down the concentration gradient. However, recently it has been found that the transporter has antiporter characteristics of exchanging neutral amino acids for abundant intracellular amino acids. Over-expression of LAT1 has been found in human cancer and is associated with playing a role in cancer metabolism.

=== Equilibrative nucleoside transporters (ENTs) ===
The nucleoside transporters, or equilibrative nucleoside transporters, are uniporters that transport nucleosides, nucleobases, and therapeutic drugs across the cell membrane. Nucleosides serve as building blocks for nucleic acid synthesis and are key components for energy metabolism in creating ATP/ GTP. They also act as ligands for purinergic receptors such as adenosine and inosine. ENTs allow the transport of nucleosides down their concentration gradient. They also have the ability to deliver nucleoside analogs to intracellular targets for the treatment of tumors and viral infections.

ENTs are part of the Major Facilitator Superfamily (MFS) and are suggested to transport nucleosides using a clamp-and-switch model. In this model, the substrate first binds to the transporter, which leads to a conformational change that forms an occluded state (clamp). Then, the transporter switches to face the other side of the membrane and releases the bound substrate (switching).

ENTs have been found in protozoa and mammals. In humans, they have been discovered as ENT1, ENT2, ENT3, and ENT4 (hENT1-4) transporters. ENTs are expressed across all tissue types, but certain ENT proteins have been found to be more abundant in specific tissues. hENT1 is found mostly in the adrenal glands, ovary, stomach and small intestines. hENT2 is expressed mostly in neurological tissues and small parts of the skin, placenta, urinary bladder, heart muscle and gallbladder. hENT3 is expressed highly in the cerebral cortex, lateral ventricle, ovary and adrenal gland. hENT4 is more commonly known as the plasma membrane monoamine transporter (PMAT), as it facilitates the movement of organic cations and biogenic amines across the membrane.

== Mechanism ==
Mechanism of uniport transport across cell membrane

Uniporters work to transport molecules or ions by passive transport across a cell membrane down its concentration gradient.

Upon binding and recognition of a specific substrate molecule on one side of the uniporter membrane, a conformational change is triggered in the transporter protein. This causes the transporter protein to change its three-dimensional shape, which ensures the substrate molecule is captured within the transporter proteins structure. The conformational change leads to the translocation of the substrate across the membrane onto the other side. On the other side of the membrane, the uniporter undergoes another conformational change in the release of the substrate molecule. The uniporter returns to its original conformation to bind another molecule for transport.

Unlike symporters and antiporters, uniporters transport one molecule/ion in a single direction based on the concentration gradient. The entire process depends on the substrate's concentration difference across the membrane to be the driving force for the transport by uniporters. Cellular energy in the form of ATP is not required for this process.

== Physiological processes ==
Uniporters play an essential role in carrying out various cellular functions. Each uniporter is specialized to facilitate the transport of a specific molecule or ion across the cell membrane. Examples of a few of the physiological roles uniporters aid in include:

1. Nutrient Uptake: Uniporters facilitate the transport of essential nutrients into the cell. Glucose transporters (GLUTs) are uniporters that uptake glucose for energy production.
2. Ion homeostasis: Uniporters facilitate in maintaining the balance of ions (i.e., Na^{+} K^{+}, Ca^{2+}, Cl^{−}) within cells
3. Metabolism: Uniporters are involved in the transport of essential ions, amino acids and molecules required for the metabolic pathway, protein synthesis and energy production
4. Cell signaling: Calcium uniporters help regulate intercellular calcium levels essential for signal transduction
5. Waste removal: Uniporters aid in removing metabolic waste products and toxins from cells
6. pH regulation: Transport of ions by uniporters also helps to maintain the overall acid-base balance within cells

== Mutations ==
Mutations in genes encoding uniporters lead to dysfunctional transporter proteins being formed. This loss of function in uniporters causes disruption in cellular function which leads to various diseases and disorders.

Gene with mutation	Disease	Result of disease
Mutations in the SLC2A1 gene which encode glucose transporters (GLUTs)	GLUT1 Deficiency Syndrome	Impaired glucose transport across the blood-brain barriers, and neurological symptoms such as seizures, development delay, and movement disorders
Mutations in the CFTR gene encoding ion channels	Cystic Fibrosis	Problems with breathing and digestion due to thick mucus forming; affects multiple organs, primarily the lungs and digestive system
Mutation in KCNA1 gene encoding potassium channels	Hypokalemic Periodic Paralysis	Periodic muscle weakness; associated with low potassium levels due to altered transport activity
Mutations in the SLC6A19 gene encoding amino acid transporter	Hartnup Disease	Impaired absorption of certain amino acid in the intestines and kidneys
Mutations in the AGXT gene encoding peroxisomal membrane transporter	Primary Hyperoxaluria	Metabolic disease; Leads to accumulation of oxalate in causing kidney stone and damage

== See also ==
- Antiporter
- Symporter
