= Glucose uptake =

Glucose being transported from the blood into cells

Glucose

Glucose uptake is the process by which glucose molecules are transported from the bloodstream into cells through specialized membrane proteins called glucose transporters, primarily via facilitated diffusion or active transport mechanisms:

Facilitated Diffusion is a passive process that relies on carrier proteins to transport glucose down a concentration gradient.

Secondary Active Transport is transport of a solute in the direction of increasing electrochemical potential via the facilitated diffusion of a second solute (usually an ion, in this case Na^{+}) in the direction of decreasing electrochemical potential. This gradient is established via primary active transport of Na^{+} ions (a process which requires ATP).

== Facilitated diffusion ==
Glucose transporters (GLUTs) are classified into three groups based on sequence similarity, with a total of 14 members. All GLUT proteins share a common structure: 12 transmembrane segments, a single N-linked glycosylation site, a large central cytoplasmic linker, and both N- and C-termini located in the cytoplasm. These transporters are expressed in nearly all body cells. While most GLUTs facilitate glucose transport, HMIT is an exception. Among them, GLUT1-5 are the most extensively studied. However, for study GLUTs 1-4 or the Class I GLUTs are the most relevant. For more information on other GLUTs see sources 3 and 7, or the GLUT specific wikipedia pages.

GLUT1 is a hydrophobic protein and 50% of GLUT1 is in the lipid bilayer. GLUT1 is present in the placenta, brain, epithelial cells of the mammary gland, transformed cells, and fetal tissue. Due to its ubiquitous presence, it is proposed that GLUT1 is at least somewhat responsible for basal glucose uptake. Basal blood glucose levels are approximately 5 mM (milimolar). The Km value—which indicates the affinity of a transporter for glucose—is 1 mM for GLUT1 and GLUT3. Since a lower Km value corresponds to a higher affinity, these transporters have a strong ability to bind and transport glucose even at low concentrations. As a result, GLUT1 facilitates a consistent glucose uptake from the bloodstream, ensuring a steady supply to tissues that rely on glucose.

GLUT2 in contrast has a high Km value (15-20mM) and therefore a low affinity for glucose. They are located in the plasma membranes of hepatocytes and pancreatic beta cells (in mice, but GLUT1 in human beta cells). The high Km of GLUT2 allows for glucose sensing; rate of glucose entry is proportional to blood glucose levels.

GLUT3 is primarily expressed in neurons, specifically in cell processes (axons and dendrites), however, it is also found in many other cells throughout the body.

GLUT4 is an insulin-responsive glucose transporter located in the heart, skeletal muscle, brain, and adipose tissue. GLUT4 is generally in vesicles in the cytoplasm. In response to insulin, more GLUT4 transporters are relocated from these vesicles to the cell membrane. At the binding of insulin (released from the islets of Langerhans) to receptors on the cell surface, a signalling cascade begins by activating phosphatidylinositolkinase activity which culminates in the movement of the cytoplasmic vesicles toward the cell surface membrane. Upon reaching the plasmalemma, the vesicles fuse with the membrane, increasing the number of GLUT4 transporters expressed at the cell surface, and hence increasing glucose uptake.

GLUT4 has a Km value for glucose of about 5 mM, which as stated above is the normal blood glucose level in healthy individuals. GLUT4 is the most abundant glucose transporter in skeletal muscle and is thus considered to be rate limiting for glucose uptake and metabolism in resting muscles. The drug metformin phosphorylates GLUT4, thereby increasing its sensitivity to insulin.

== Secondary active transport ==
Facilitated diffusion can occur between the bloodstream and cells as the concentration gradient between the extracellular and intracellular environments is such that no ATP hydrolysis is required. However, in the kidney, glucose is reabsorbed from the filtrate in the tubule lumen, where it is at a relatively low concentration, passes through the simple cuboidal epithelia lining the kidney tubule, and into the bloodstream where glucose is at a comparatively high concentration. Therefore, the concentration gradient of glucose opposes its reabsorption, and energy is required for its transport.

The secondary active transport of glucose in the kidney is Na^{+} linked; therefore an Na^{+} gradient must be established. This is achieved through the action of the Na^{+}/K^{+} pump, the energy for which is provided through the hydrolysis of ATP. Three Na^{+} ions are extruded from the cell in exchange for two K^{+} ions entering through the intramembrane enzyme Na^{+}/K^{+}-ATPase; this leaves a relative deficiency of Na^{+} in the intracellular compartment. Na^{+} ions diffuse down their concentration gradient into the columnar epithelia, co-transporting glucose. Once inside the epithelial cells, glucose reenters the bloodstream through facilitated diffusion through GLUT2 transporters.

Hence reabsorption of glucose is dependent upon the existing sodium gradient which is generated through the active functioning of the Na^{+}/K^{+}-ATPase. As the cotransport of glucose with sodium from the lumen does not directly require ATP hydrolysis but depends upon the action of the ATPase, this is described as secondary active transport.

There are two types of secondary active transporter found within the kidney tubule; close to the glomerulus, where glucose levels are high, SGLT2 has a low affinity yet high capacity for glucose transport. SGLT1 transporters are found close to the loop of Henle and in the distal convoluted tubule of the nephron where much glucose has been reabsorbed into the bloodstream. These have a high affinity for glucose and a low capacity. Functioning in conjunction, these two secondary active transporters ensure that only negligible amounts of glucose are wasted through excretion in the urine.
