= Passive transport =

Transport that does not require energy

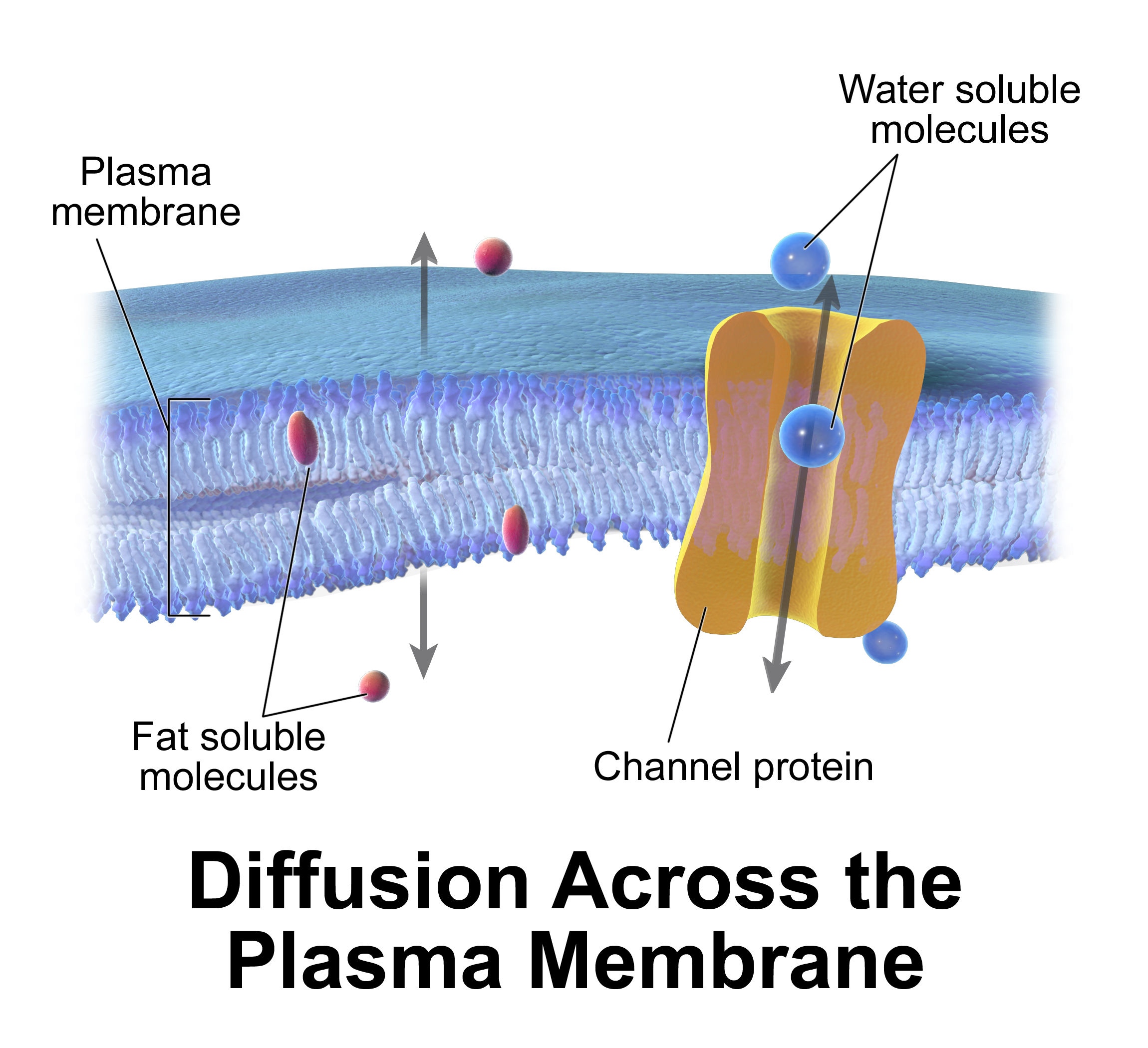
Passive diffusion across a cell membrane.

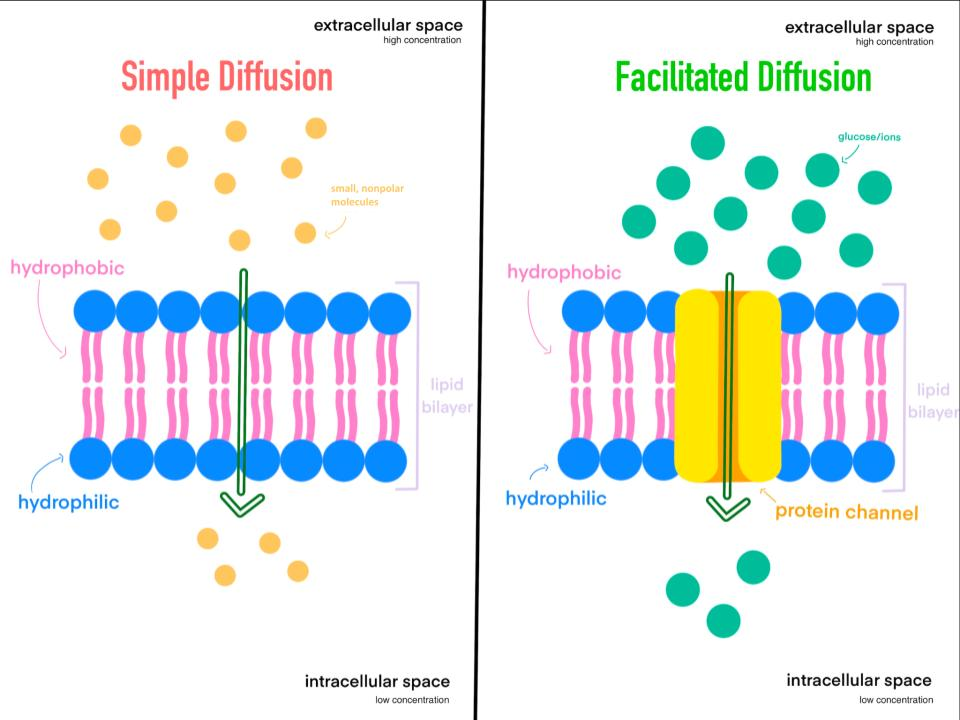
Diffusion (a form of passive transport) across the phospholipid bilayer, which is semipermeable, is demonstrated through simple and facilitated diffusion. Simple diffusion does not require energy, while small, non-polar molecules move from a high to a low solute concentration. Facilitated diffusion also does not require energy, yet it needs a protein channel to move large and polar molecules.

Passive transport is a type of membrane transport that does not require energy to move substances across cell membranes. Instead of using cellular energy, like active transport, passive transport relies on the second law of thermodynamics to drive the movement of substances across cell membranes. Fundamentally, substances follow Fick's first law, and move from an area of high concentration to an area of low concentration because this movement increases the entropy of the overall system. The rate of passive transport depends on the permeability of the cell membrane, which, in turn, depends on the organization and characteristics of the membrane lipids and proteins. The four main kinds of passive transport are simple diffusion, facilitated diffusion, filtration, and/or osmosis.

Passive transport follows Fick's first law.

== Diffusion ==
Passive diffusion on a cell membrane.

Diffusion is the net movement of material from an area of high concentration to an area with lower concentration. The difference of concentration between the two areas is often termed as the concentration gradient, and diffusion will continue until this gradient has been eliminated. Since diffusion moves materials from an area of higher concentration to an area of lower concentration, it is described as moving solutes "down the concentration gradient" (compared with active transport, which often moves material from area of low concentration to area of higher concentration, and therefore referred to as moving the material "against the concentration gradient"). However, in many cases (e.g. passive drug transport) the driving force of passive transport can not be simplified to the concentration gradient. If there are different solutions at the two sides of the membrane with different equilibrium solubility of the drug, the difference in the degree of saturation is the driving force of passive membrane transport. It is also true for supersaturated solutions which are more and more important owing to the spreading of the application of amorphous solid dispersions for drug bioavailability enhancement.

Simple diffusion and osmosis are in some ways similar. Simple diffusion is the passive movement of solute from a high concentration to a lower concentration until the concentration of the solute is uniform throughout and reaches equilibrium. Osmosis is much like simple diffusion but it specifically describes the movement of water (not the solute) across a selectively permeable membrane until there is an equal concentration of water and solute on both sides of the membrane. Simple diffusion and osmosis are both forms of passive transport and require none of the cell's ATP energy.

=== Speed of diffusion ===
For passive diffusion, the law of diffusion states that the mean squared displacement is $\langle r^{2}\rangle =2dDt$ with d being the number of dimensions and D the diffusion coefficient). So to diffuse a distance of about $x$ takes time $\sim x^2/2dD$, and the "average speed" is $\sim 2dD / x$. This means that in the same physical environment, diffusion is fast when the distance is small, but less when the distance is large.

This can be seen in material transport within the cell. Prokaryotes typically have small bodies, allowing diffusion to suffice for material transport within the cell. Larger cells like eukaryotes would either have very low metabolic rate to accommodate the slowness of diffusion, or invest in complex cellular machinery to allow active transport within the cell, such as kinesin walking along microtubules.

=== Example of diffusion: gas exchange ===
A biological example of diffusion is the gas exchange that occurs during respiration within the human body. Upon inhalation, oxygen is brought into the lungs and quickly diffuses across the membrane of alveoli and enters the circulatory system by diffusing across the membrane of the pulmonary capillaries. Simultaneously, carbon dioxide moves in the opposite direction, diffusing across the membrane of the capillaries and entering into the alveoli, where it can be exhaled. The process of moving oxygen into the cells, and carbon dioxide out, occurs because of the concentration gradient of these substances, each moving away from their respective areas of higher concentration toward areas of lower concentration. Cellular respiration is the cause of the low concentration of oxygen and high concentration of carbon dioxide within the blood which creates the concentration gradient. Because the gasses are small and uncharged, they are able to pass directly through the cell membrane without any special membrane proteins. No energy is required because the movement of the gasses follows Fick's first law and the second law of thermodynamics.

== Facilitated diffusion ==
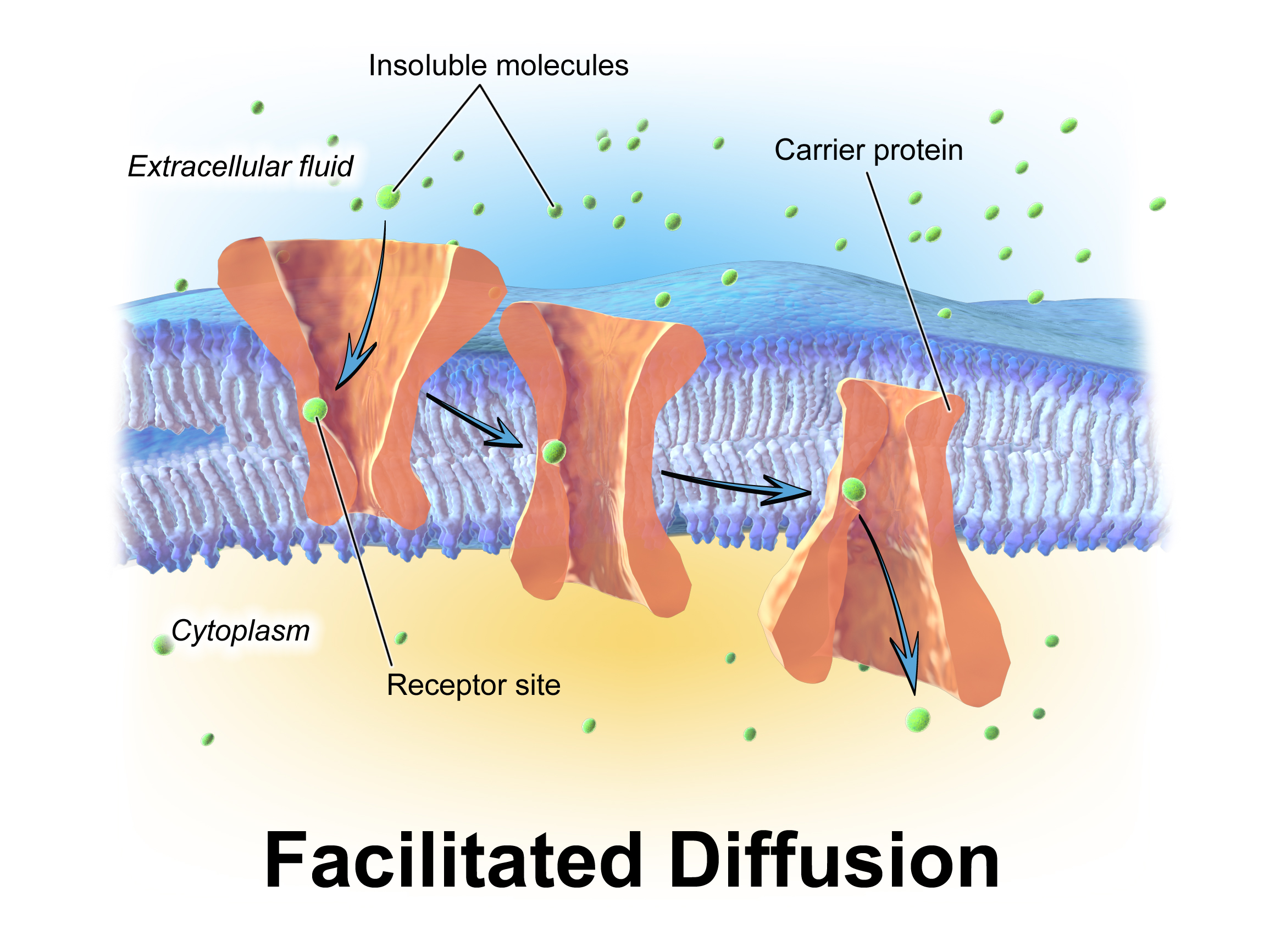
Depiction of facilitated diffusion.

Facilitated diffusion, also called carrier-mediated osmosis, is the movement of molecules across the cell membrane via special transport proteins that are embedded in the plasma membrane by actively taking up or excluding ions ^{[14]}. Through facilitated diffusion, energy is not required in order for molecules to pass through the cell membrane. Active transport of protons by H^{+} ATPases alters membrane potential allowing for facilitated passive transport of particular ions such as potassium down their charge gradient through high affinity transporters and channels.

=== Example of facilitated diffusion: GLUT2 ===
An example of facilitated diffusion is when glucose is absorbed into cells through Glucose transporter 2 (GLUT2) in the human body. There are many other types of glucose transport proteins, some that do require energy, and are therefore not examples of passive transport. Since glucose is a large molecule, it requires a specific channel to facilitate its entry across plasma membranes and into cells. When diffusing into a cell through GLUT2, the driving force that moves glucose into the cell is the concentration gradient. The main difference between simple diffusion and facilitated diffusion is that facilitated diffusion requires a transport protein to 'facilitate' or assist the substance through the membrane. After a meal, the cell is signaled to move GLUT2 into membranes of the cells lining the intestines called enterocytes. With GLUT2 in place after a meal and the relative high concentration of glucose outside of these cells as compared to within them, the concentration gradient drives glucose across the cell membrane through GLUT2.

== Filtration ==
Filtration.

Filtration is movement of water and solute molecules across the cell membrane due to hydrostatic pressure generated by the cardiovascular system. Depending on the size of the membrane pores, only solutes of a certain size may pass through it. For example, the membrane pores of the Bowman's capsule in the kidneys are very small, and only albumins, the smallest of the proteins, have any chance of being filtered through. On the other hand, the membrane pores of liver cells are extremely large, but not forgetting cells are extremely small to allow a variety of solutes to pass through and be metabolized.

== Osmosis ==
Effect of osmosis on blood cells under different solutions.

Osmosis is the net movement of water molecules across a selectively permeable membrane from an area of high water potential to an area of low water potential. A cell with a less negative water potential will draw in water, but this depends on other factors as well such as solute potential (pressure in the cell e.g. solute molecules) and pressure potential (external pressure e.g. cell wall). There are three types of Osmosis solutions: the isotonic solution, hypotonic solution, and hypertonic solution. Isotonic solution is when the extracellular solute concentration is balanced with the concentration inside the cell. In the Isotonic solution, the water molecules still move between the solutions, but the rates are the same from both directions, thus the water movement is balanced between the inside of the cell as well as the outside of the cell. A hypotonic solution is when the solute concentration outside the cell is lower than the concentration inside the cell. In hypotonic solutions, the water moves into the cell, down its concentration gradient (from higher to lower water concentrations). That can cause the cell to swell. Cells that don't have a cell wall, such as animal cells, could burst in this solution. A hypertonic solution is when the solute concentration is higher (think of hyper - as high) than the concentration inside the cell. In hypertonic solution, the water will move out, causing the cell to shrink.

== See also ==
- Active transport
- Transport phenomena
