= Snf3 =

Protein-coding gene in the species Saccharomyces cerevisiae S288c

High-affinity glucose transporter SNF3

Identifiers
- Symbol: SNF3
- RefSeq: NP_010087.1
- UniProt: P10870
Search for
- Structures: Swiss-model
- Domains: InterPro

Snf3 is a protein which regulates glucose uptake in yeast. It senses glucose in the environment with high affinity.

== Introduction ==
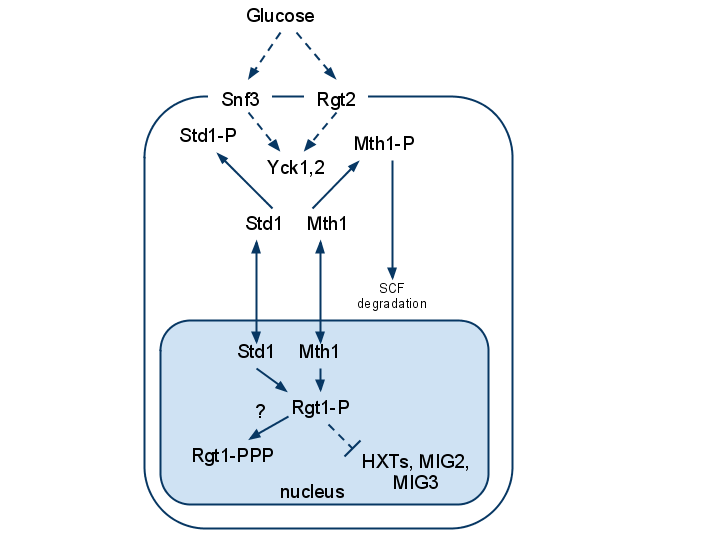
Diagram of yeast signaling pathways in response to glucose. Solid arrows represent transformations and/or translocations and dotted lines represent regulatory or catalytic influences.

Glucose sensing and signaling in budding yeast is similar to the mammalian system in many ways. However, there are also significant differences. Mammalian cells regulate their glucose uptake via hormones (i.e. insulin and glucagon) or intermediary metabolites. In contrast, yeast as a unicellular organism does not depend on hormones but on nutrients in the medium. The presence of glucose induces a conformational change in the membrane proteins Snf3/Rgt2 or Gpr1, and regulates expression of genes involved in glucose metabolism.

== Homology and function ==
Snf3 is homologous to multiple sugar transporters, it shares high similarity to the glucose transporters of rat brain cells and human HepG2 hepatoma cells, as well as to the arabinose and xylose transporters (AraE and XylE) of Escherichia coli. Based on this homology and on genetic studies, Snf3 was initially thought to be a high affinity glucose transporter.

Later, it was found that Snf3 is not a glucose transporter, but rather a high affinity glucose sensor. It senses glucose at low concentrations and regulates transcription of the HXT genes, which encode for glucose transporters. If glucose is absent Snf3 is quiescent and transcription of the HXT genes is inhibited by a repressing complex. The complex consisting of several subunits such as Rgt1, Mth1/Std1, Cyc8 and Tup1 binds to the promoters of the HXT genes, thereby blocking their transcription.

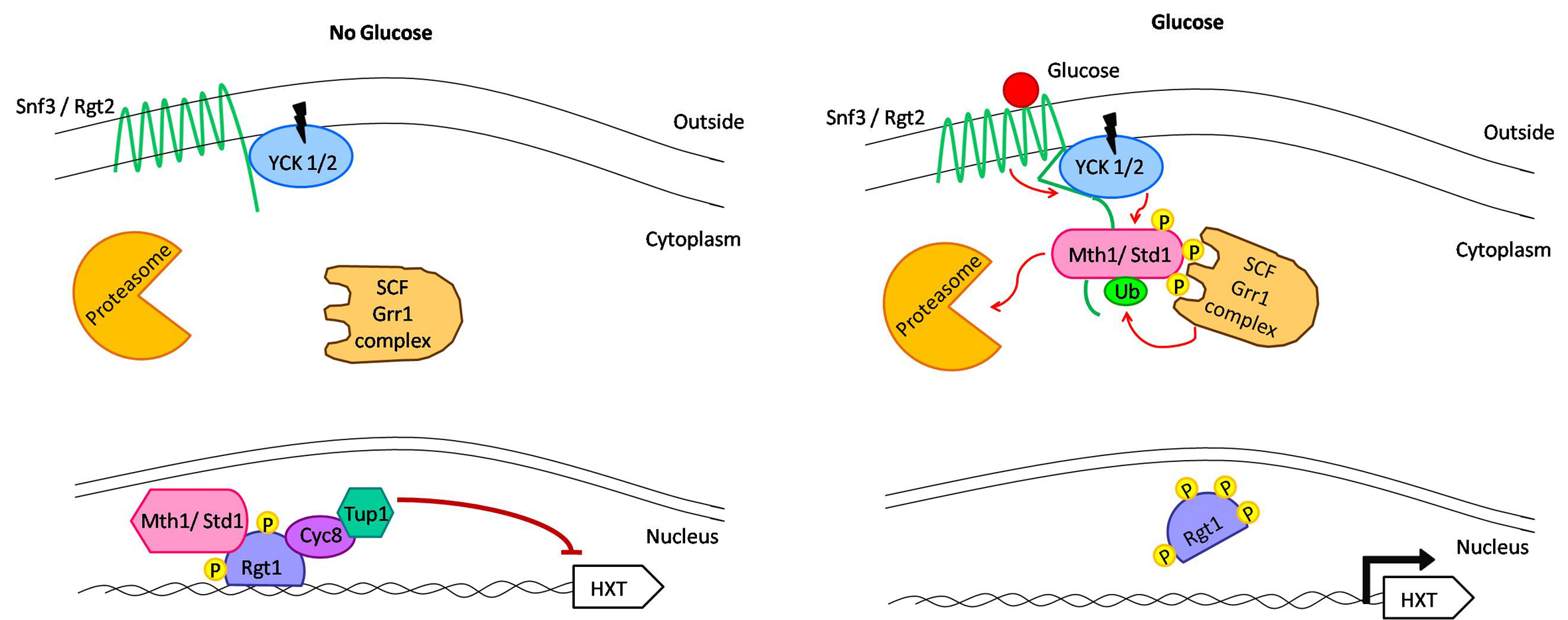
Snf3/Rgt2-singalling pathway. In absence of glucose repressing complex composed of Rgt1, Mth1/Std1, Cyc8 and Tup1 blocks transcription of HXT genes. When glucose (Glu) is present casein kinase is activated and phosphorylates Mth1/Std1 which is subsequently ubiquitinated and degraded by the proteasome allowing transcription to proceed.

Snf3 is able to bind even low amounts of glucose due to its high affinity. The induction of Snf3 by glucose leads to the activation of YckI, a yeast casein kinase. This is followed by the recruitment of Mth1 and Std1 to the C-terminus of Snf3 which facilitates the phosphorylation of the two proteins by YckI. Phosphorylated Mth1 and Std1 are subsequently tagged for proteasome dependent degradation by SCF^{Grrl}, an E3 ubiquitin ligase. Therefore, the inhibitory complex misses two of its key components and cannot be assembled. Thus, repression of the HXT genes is abolished, leading to the expression of the glucose transporters and subsequently glucose import.

== Structure ==
The putative topology of yeast Snf3. The C-terminal extension is not shown in its complete size. In reality it comprises 303 of the 845 residues.

Snf3 is a plasma membrane protein in yeasts that consists of 12 (2x6) transmembrane domains, like the homologous glucose transporters. Its structure is distinct from the homologous transporters in particular by a long C-terminal tail which is predicted to reside in the cytoplasm.

The long C-terminal tail plays an important role in glucose signaling and is probably the signaling domain itself. A soluble version of the C-terminal tail alone is sufficient to induce glucose transport.

All glucose transporters including Snf3 contain an arginine residue situated in a cytoplasmic loop preceding the fifth transmembrane domain. If this position is mutated, Snf3 adopts a state of constant glucose induction irrespective of whether there are nutrients present or not; this suggests an involvement in the glucose sensing process.

== Regulation ==
The regulation of Snf3 in S. cerevisiae and its downstream events are still poorly understood, but it seems clear that a second glucose sensor Rgt2 influences Snf3 and vice versa. Furthermore, it is unclear whether these two proteins sense the glucose concentration on the outside or inside the cell. Snf3 and Rgt2 influence directly or indirectly several Hxt-transporters which are responsible for the glucose uptake. Low extracellular glucose concentrations are sensed by the Snf3 protein which probably leads to the expression of Hxt2-Genes for high affinity glucose transporters, while Rgt2 senses high glucose concentrations and leads to the expression of low affinity glucose transporters, like Hxt1 Although the downstream pathway is poorly understood it seems that Snf3 and Rgt2 transmit a signal directly or indirectly to Grr1, the DNA binding protein Rgt1, and the two cofactors Ssn6 and Tup1. Also needed for the transcription are the two nuclear proteins Mth1 and Std1.
