= NHCT =

NHCT may refer to:

- New Haven, Connecticut, city in Connecticut and in the United States
- Na (sodium) - K (potassium) cotransporter. See: Sodium-proton antiporter
- Non-contrast helical CT. See computed tomography
