= Glucose transporter =

Family of monosaccharide transport proteins

Sugar_tr

Identifiers
- Symbol: Sugar_tr
- Pfam: PF00083
- Pfam clan: CL0015
- InterPro: IPR005828
- PROSITE: PDOC00190
- TCDB: 2.A.1.1
- OPM superfamily: 15
- OPM protein: 4gc0
- CDD: cd17315
Available protein structures:
- PDB: IPR005828 PF00083 (ECOD; PDBsum)
- AlphaFold: IPR005828; PF00083

Glucose

Glucose transporters are a wide group of membrane proteins that facilitate the transport of glucose across the plasma membrane, a process known as facilitated diffusion. Because glucose is a vital source of energy for all life, these transporters are present in all phyla. The GLUT or SLC2A family are a protein family that is found in most mammalian cells. 14 GLUTS are encoded by the human genome. GLUT is a type of uniporter transporter protein.

== Synthesis of free glucose ==
Most non-autotrophic cells are unable to produce free glucose because they lack expression of glucose-6-phosphatase and, thus, are involved only in glucose uptake and catabolism. Usually produced only in hepatocytes, in fasting conditions, other tissues such as the intestines, muscles, brain, and kidneys are able to produce glucose following activation of gluconeogenesis.

== Glucose transport in yeast ==
In Saccharomyces cerevisiae glucose transport takes place through facilitated diffusion. The transport proteins are mainly from the Hxt family, but many other transporters have been identified.

Name	Properties	Notes
Snf3		low-glucose sensor; repressed by glucose; low expression level; repressor of Hxt6
Rgt2		high-glucose sensor; low expression level
Hxt1	Km: 100 mM, 129 - 107 mM	low-affinity glucose transporter; induced by high glucose level
Hxt2	Km = 1.5 - 10 mM	high/intermediate-affinity glucose transporter; induced by low glucose level
Hxt3	Vm = 18.5, Kd = 0.078, Km = 28.6/34.2 - 60 mM	low-affinity glucose transporter
Hxt4	Vm = 12.0, Kd = 0.049, Km = 6.2	intermediate-affinity glucose transporter
Hxt5	Km = 10 mM	Moderate glucose affinity. Abundant during stationary phase, sporulation and low glucose conditions. Transcription repressed by glucose.
Hxt6	Vm = 11.4, Kd = 0.029, Km = 0.9/14, 1.5 mM	high glucose affinity
Hxt7	Vm = 11.7, Kd = 0.039, Km = 1.3, 1.9, 1.5 mM	high glucose affinity
Hxt8		low expression level
Hxt9		involved in pleiotropic drug resistance
Hxt11		involved in pleiotropic drug resistance
Gal2	Vm = 17.5, Kd = 0.043, Km = 1.5, 1.6	high galactose affinity

== Glucose transport in mammals ==
GLUTs are integral membrane proteins that contain 12 membrane-spanning helices with both the amino and carboxyl termini exposed on the cytoplasmic side of the plasma membrane. GLUT proteins transport glucose and related hexoses according to a model of alternate conformation, which predicts that the transporter exposes a single substrate binding site toward either the outside or the inside of the cell. Binding of glucose to one site provokes a conformational change associated with transport, and releases glucose to the other side of the membrane. The inner and outer glucose-binding sites are, it seems, located in transmembrane segments 9, 10, 11; also, the DLS motif located in the seventh transmembrane segment could be involved in the selection and affinity of transported substrate.

=== Types ===
Each glucose transporter isoform plays a specific role in glucose metabolism determined by its pattern of tissue expression, substrate specificity, transport kinetics, and regulated expression in different physiological conditions. To date, 14 members of the GLUT/SLC2 have been identified. On the basis of sequence similarities, the GLUT family has been divided into three subclasses.

==== Class I ====
Class I comprises the well-characterized glucose transporters GLUT1-GLUT4.

Name	Distribution	Notes
GLUT1	Is widely distributed in fetal tissues. In the adult, it is expressed at highest levels in erythrocytes and also in the endothelial cells of barrier tissues such as the blood–brain barrier. It is also the main glucose transporter in the Cornea and Lens of the Eye, as well as in pancreatic beta cells. It is responsible for the low level of basal glucose uptake required to sustain respiration in all cells.	Levels in cell membranes are increased by reduced glucose levels and decreased by increased glucose levels. GLUT1 expression is upregulated in many tumors.
GLUT2	Is a bidirectional transporter, allowing glucose to flow in 2 directions. Is expressed by renal tubular cells, and liver cells. It is also present in the basolateral membrane of the small intestine epithelium. Bidirectionality is required in liver cells to uptake glucose for glycolysis and glycogenesis, and release of glucose during gluconeogenesis. All three monosaccharides (glucose, galactose, and fructose) are transported from the intestinal mucosal cell into the portal circulation by GLUT2.	Is a high-frequency and low-affinity isoform.
GLUT3	Expressed mostly in neurons (where it is believed to be the main glucose transporter isoform), and in the placenta. It is also present in pancreatic beta cells.	Is a high-affinity isoform, allowing it to transport even in times of low glucose concentrations.
GLUT4	Expressed in adipose tissues and striated muscle (skeletal muscle and cardiac muscle).	Is the insulin-regulated glucose transporter. Responsible for insulin-regulated glucose storage.
GLUT14	Expressed in testes	similarity to GLUT3

==== Classes II/III ====
Class II comprises:

- GLUT5 (SLC2A5), a fructose transporter in enterocytes
- GLUT7 (SLC2A7), found in the small and large intestine, transporting glucose out of the endoplasmic reticulum
- GLUT9 (SLC2A9), recently has been found to transport uric acid
- GLUT11 (SLC2A11)

Class III comprises:

- GLUT6 (SLC2A6),
- GLUT8 (SLC2A8),
- GLUT10 (SLC2A10),
- GLUT12 (SLC2A12), and
- GLUT13, also H+/myo-inositol transporter HMIT (SLC2A13), primarily expressed in brain.

Most members of classes II and III have been identified recently in homology searches of EST databases and the sequence information provided by the various genome projects.

The function of these new glucose transporter isoforms is still not clearly defined at present. Several of them (GLUT6, GLUT8) are made of motifs that help retain them intracellularly and therefore prevent glucose transport. Whether mechanisms exist to promote cell-surface translocation of these transporters is not yet known, but it has clearly been established that insulin does not promote GLUT6 and GLUT8 cell-surface translocation.

=== Discovery of sodium-glucose cotransport ===
In August 1960, in Prague, Robert K. Crane presented for the first time his discovery of the sodium-glucose cotransport as the mechanism for intestinal glucose absorption. Crane's discovery of cotransport was the first ever proposal of flux coupling in biology. Crane in 1961 was the first to formulate the cotransport concept to explain active transport. Specifically, he proposed that the accumulation of glucose in the intestinal epithelium across the brush border membrane was [is] coupled to downhill Na+ transport cross the brush border. This hypothesis was rapidly tested, refined, and extended [to] encompass the active transport of a diverse range of molecules and ions into virtually every cell type.

== See also ==
- Cotransport
- Cotransporter
- GLUT1 deficiency syndrome
- GLUT2 deficiency syndrome
