= Cotransporter =

Type of membrane transport proteins

Cotransporters are a subcategory of membrane transport proteins (transporters) that couple the favorable movement of one molecule with its concentration gradient and unfavorable movement of another molecule against its concentration gradient. They enable coupled or cotransport (secondary active transport) and include antiporters and symporters. In general, cotransporters consist of two out of the three classes of integral membrane proteins known as transporters that move molecules and ions across biomembranes. Uniporters are also transporters but move only one type of molecule down its concentration gradient and are not classified as cotransporters.

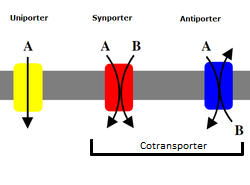
Basic difference between the cotransporters known as antiporters and symporters, and the uniporter transporter.

== Background ==
Cotransporters are capable of moving solutes either up or down gradients at rates of 1,000 to 100,000 molecules per second. They may act as channels or transporters, depending on conditions under which they are assayed. The movement occurs by binding to two molecules or ions at a time and using the gradient of one solute's concentration to force the other molecule or ion against its gradient. Some studies show that cotransporters can function as ion channels, contradicting the classical models. For instance, the wheat HKT1 transporter shows two modes of transport by the same protein.

Cotransporters can be classified as antiporters and symporters. Both use electric potential, chemical gradients, or both to move protons and ions against a concentration gradient. In plants, the proton is considered a secondary substance, and high proton concentration in the apoplast powers the inward movement of certain ions by symporters. A proton gradient causes ions to be moved into the vacuole by the proton-sodium antiporter or the proton-calcium antiporter. In plants, sucrose transport is distributed throughout the plant by the proton-pump; the pump creates a gradient of protons so that there are many more on one side of the membrane than the other. As the protons diffuse back across the membrane, the free energy liberated by this diffusion is used to co-transport sucrose. In mammals, glucose is transported through sodium-dependent glucose transporters, a process that uses energy. Since both glucose and sodium are transported in the same direction across the membrane, they are classified as symporters. The glucose transporter system was first hypothesized by Robert K. Crane in 1960.

== History ==
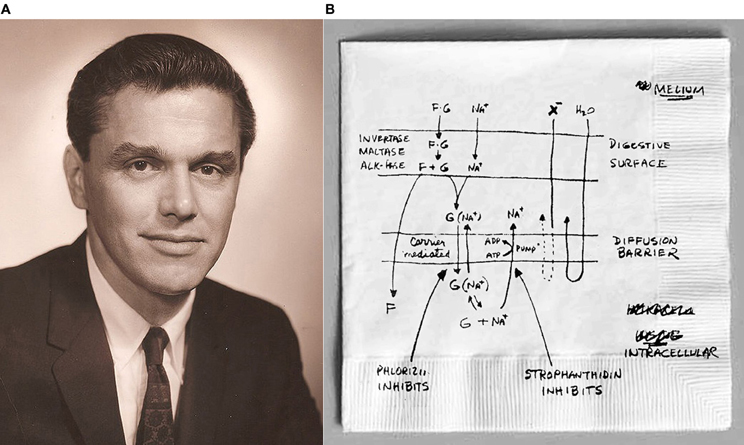
Dr Robert K. Crane and his sketch for coupled cotransport

Robert K. Crane, a Harvard graduate, had been working in the field of carbohydrate biochemistry for quite some time. His experience in the areas of glucose-6-phosphate biochemistry, carbon dioxide fixation, hexokinase and phosphate studies led him to hypothesize cotransport of glucose along with sodium through the intestine. Pictured right is of Dr. Crane and his drawing of the cotransporter system he proposed in 1960, at the international meet on membrane transport and metabolism. His studies were confirmed by other groups and are now used as the classical model to understand cotransporters.

== Mechanism ==
Antiporters and symporters both transport two or more different types of molecules at the same time in a coupled movement. An energetically unfavored movement of one molecule is combined with an energetically favorable movement of another molecule(s) or ion(s) to provide the power needed for transport. This type of transport is known as secondary active transport and is powered by the energy derived from the concentration gradient of the ions/molecules across the membrane the cotransporter protein is integrated within.

Cotransporters undergo a cycle of conformational changes by linking the movement of an ion with its concentration gradient (downhill movement) to the movement of a cotransported solute against its concentration gradient (uphill movement). In one conformation the protein will have the binding site (or sites in the case of symporters) exposed to one side of the membrane. Upon binding of both the molecule which is to be transported uphill and the molecule to be transported downhill a conformational change will occur. This conformational change will expose the bound substrates to the opposite side of the membrane, where the substrates will disassociate. Both the molecule and the cation must be bound in order for the conformational change to occur. This mechanism was first introduced by Oleg Jardetzky in 1966. This cycle of conformational changes only transports one substrate ion at a time, which results in a fairly slow transport rate (10^{0} to 10^{4} ions or molecules per second) when compared to other transport proteins like ion channels. The rate at which this cycle of conformational changes occurs is called the turnover rate (TOR) and is expressed as the average number of complete cycles per second performed by a single cotransporter molecule.

== Types ==
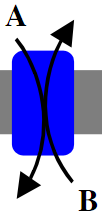
antiporter

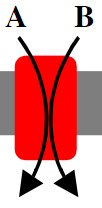
symporter

=== Antiporters ===
Antiporters use the mechanism of cotransport (coupling the movement of one ion or molecule down its concentration gradient with the transport of another ion or molecule up its concentration gradient), to move the ions and molecule in opposite directions. In this situation one of the ions will move from the exoplasmic space into the cytoplasmic space while the other ion will move from the cytoplasmic space into the exoplasmic space. An example of an antiporter is the sodium-calcium exchanger. The sodium-calcium exchanger functions to remove excess calcium from the cytoplasmic space into the exoplasmic space against its concentration gradient by coupling its transport with the transport of sodium from the exoplasmic space down its concentration gradient (established by the active transport of sodium out of the cell by the sodium-potassium pump) into the cytoplasmic space. The sodium-calcium exchanger exchanges 3 sodium ions for 1 calcium ion and represents a cation antiporter.

Cells also contain anion antiporters such as the Band 3 (or AE1) anion transport protein. This cotransporter is an important integral protein in mammalian erythrocytes and moves chloride ion and bicarbonate ion in a one-to-one ratio across the plasma membrane based only on the concentration gradient of the two ions. The AE1 antiporter is essential in the removal of carbon dioxide waste that is converted to bicarbonate inside the erythrocyte.

=== Symporters ===
In contrast to antiporters, symporters move ions or molecules in the same direction. In this case both ions being transported will be moved either from the exoplasmic space into the cytoplasmic space or from the cytoplasmic space into the exoplasmic space. An example of a symporter is the sodium-glucose linked transporter or SGLT. The SGLT functions to couple the transport of sodium in the exoplasmic space down its concentration gradient (again, established by the active transport of sodium out of the cell by the sodium-potassium pump) into the cytoplasmic space to the transport of glucose in the exoplasmic space against its concentration gradient into the cytoplasmic space. The SGLT couples the movement of 1 glucose ion with the movement of 2 sodium ions.

=== Examples of cotransporters ===
Na^{+}/glucose cotransporter (SGLT1) – is also known as sodium-glucose cotransporter 1 and is encoded by the SLC5A1 gene. SGLT1 is an electrogenic transporter as the sodium electrochemical gradient drives glucose uphill into the cells. SGLT1 is a high affinity Na^{+} /glucose cotransporter that has an important role in transferring sugar across the epithelial cells of renal proximal tubules and of the intestine, in particular the small intestine.

Na^{+}/phosphate cotransporter (NaPi) – Sodium-phosphate cotransporters are from the SLC34 and SLC20 protein families. They are also found across the epithelial cells of renal proximal tubule and of the small intestine. It transfers inorganic phosphate into cells through active transport with the help of a Na^{+} gradient. Similar to SGTL1, they are classified as electrogenic transporters. NaPi coupled with 3 Na^{+} ions and 1 divalent Pi, are classified as NaPi IIa and NaPi IIb. NaPi that couples with 2 Na^{+} and 1 divalent Pi are classified as NaPi IIc.

Na^{+}/I^{−} symporter (NIS) – Sodium-Iodide is a type of symporter that is responsible for transferring iodide in the thyroid gland. NIS is primarily found in cells of the thyroid gland and also in the mammary glands. They are located on the basolateral membrane of thyroid follicular cells where 2 Na^{+} ions and 1 I^{−} ion is coupled to transfer the iodide. NIS activity helps in the diagnosis and treatment of thyroid disease, including the highly successful treatment of thyroid cancer with radioiodide after thyroidectomy.

Na-K-2Cl symporter – This specific cotransporter regulates the cell volume by controlling the water and electrolyte content within the cell. The Na-K-2Cl Cotransporter is vital in salt secretion in secretory epithelia cells along with renal salt reabsorption. Two variations of the Na-K-2Cl symporter exist and are known as NKCC1 and NKCC2. The NKCC1 cotransport protein is found throughout the body but NKCC2 is found only in the kidney and removes the sodium, potassium, and chloride found in the body's urine, so it can be absorbed into the blood.

GABA transporter (GAT) – neurotransmitter γ-aminobutyric acid (GABA) transporters are members of the solute carrier family 6 (SLC6) of sodium- and chloride-dependent neurotransmitter receptor transporters that are located in the plasma membrane and regulate the concentration of GABA in the synaptic cleft. The SLC6A1 gene encodes GABA transporters. The transporters are electrogenic and couples 2 Na^{+}, 1 Cl^{−} and 1 GABA for inward translocation.

K^{+}Cl^{−} Symporter – The K^{+}-Cl^{−} cotransporter family consists of four specific symporters known as KCC1, KCC2, KCC3, and KCC4. The KCC2 isoform is specific to neuronal tissue and the other three can be found in various tissues throughout the body. This cotransporter family controls the concentration levels of potassium and chloride within cells through the combined movement of K^{+}/H^{+} and Cl^{−}/HCO3^{−} exchangers or through combined movement of both ions due to concentration activated channels. The four known KCC proteins team up to form two separate subfamilies with KCC1 and KCC3 pairing together and KCC2 and KCC4 becoming a pair to facilitate ion movement.

== Associated diseases ==
Table 1: List of diseases related to transporters.

Transporter Symbols/Names	Relevant Diseases
4F2HC, SLC3A2	Lysinuric
ABC-1, ABC1	Tangier disease
ABC7, hABC7	X-linked sideroblastic anemia
ABCR	Stargardt disease, Fundus flavimaculatus
AE1, SLC4A1	elliptocytosis, ovalocytosis, hemolytic anemia, spherocytosis, renal tubular acidosis
AE2, SLC4A2	congenital chloroidorrhea
AE3, SLC4A3	congenital chloroidorrhea
ALDR	Adrenoleukodystrophy
ANK	ankylosis (calcification); arthritis accompanied by mineral deposition, formation of bony outgrowths, and joint destruction
Aralar-like, SLC25A13	adult-onset type II citrullinemia
ATBo, SLC1A5, hATBo, ASCT2, AAAT	Neurodegeneration
BCMP1, UCP4, SLC25A14	HHH
CFTR	Cystic fibrosis
CTR-1, SLC31A1	Menkes/Wilsons disease
CTR-2, SLC31A2	Menkes/Wilsons disease, X-linked hypophosphatemia
DTD, SLC26A2	chondrodysplasias/ Diastrophic dysplasia
EAAT1, SLC1A3, GLAST1	Neurodegeneration, Amyotrophic lateral sclerosis
EAAT2, SLC1A2, GLT-1	Neurodegeneration, Dicarboxylic aminoaciduria
EAAT3, SLC1A1, EAAC1	Neurodegeneration
EAAT4, SLC1A6	Neurodegeneration
EAAT5, SLC1A7	Neurodegeneration
FIC1	Progressive familial intrahepatic cholestasis
FOLT, SLC19A1, RFC1	Folate malabsorption/megaloblastic anemia
GLUT1, SLC2A1	low CNS glucose causing seizures, Fanconi-Bickel syndrome, Glycogen storage disease type Id, Non-insulin-dependent diabetes mellitus, defect in glucose transport across the blood-brain barrier
GLUT2, SLC2A2	low CNS glucose causing seizures, Fanconi-Bickel syndrome, Glycogen storage disease type Id, Non-insulin-dependent diabetes mellitus (NIDDM)
GLUT3, SLC2A3	low CNS glucose causing seizures, Fanconi-Bickel syndrome, Glycogen storage disease type Id, Non-insulin-dependent diabetes mellitus (NIDDM)
GLUT4, SLC2A4	low CNS glucose causing seizures, Fanconi-Bickel syndrome, Glycogen storage disease type Id, Non-insulin-dependent diabetes mellitus (NIDDM)
GLUT5, SLC2A5	Isolated fructose malabsorption
HET	anemia, genetic hemochromatosis
HTT, SLC6A4	anxiety-related traits
LAT-2, SLC7A6	Lysinuric protein intolerance
LAT-3, SLC7A7	lysinuric protein intolerance
MDR1	human cancers
MDR2, MDR3	Familia intrahepatic cholestasis
MRP1	human cancers
NBC	Down syndrome
NBC1, SLC4A4	renal tubular acidosis
NBC3, SLC4A7	congenital hypothyroidism
NCCT, SLC12A3, TSC	Gitelman syndrome
NHE2, SLC9A2	Microvillus inclusion disease
NHE3, SLC9A3/3P	Microvillus inclusion disease
NIS, SLC5A5	congenital hypothyroidism
NKCC1, SLC12A2	gitelman syndrome
NKCC2, SLC12A1	Bartter syndrome
NORTR	DiGeorge syndrome, velocardiofacial syndrome
NRAMP2, DCT1, SLC11A2,	Attention deficit hyperactivity disorder
NTCP2, ISBT, SLC10A2	primary bile acid malabsorption (PBAM)
OCTN2, SLC22A5	systemic carnitine deficiency (progressive cardiomyopathy, skeletal myopathy, hypoglycaemia, hyperammonaemia, sudden infant death syndrome)
ORNT1, SLC25A15	HHH
PMP34, SLC25A17	Graves disease
rBAT, SLC3A1, D2	cystinuria
SATT, SLC1A4, ASCT1	Neurodegeneration
SBC2	hypocitraturia
SERT	various mental disorders
SGLT1, SLC5A1	renal glucosuria / glucose-galactose malabsorption
SGLT2, SLC5A2	renal glucosuria
SMVT, SLC5A6	anxiety-related traits, depression
TAP1	juvenile onset psoriasis
y+L	Type I cystinuria

== See also ==
- Na-K-2Cl symporter
- K-Cl cotransporter
- Sodium/phosphate cotransporter
- Sodium-glucose transport proteins
- Glucose transporter
- Cystic fibrosis
