= Symporter =

Class of membrane transport proteins

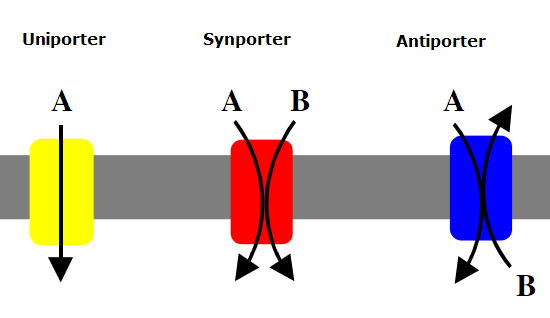
Comparison of transport proteins

A symporter is an integral membrane protein that is involved in the transport of two (or more) different molecules across the cell membrane in the same direction. The symporter works in the plasma membrane and molecules are transported across the cell membrane at the same time, and is, therefore, a type of cotransporter. The transporter is called a symporter, because the molecules will travel in the same direction in relation to each other. This is in contrast to the antiport transporter. Typically, the ion(s) will move down the electrochemical gradient, allowing the other molecule(s) to move against the concentration gradient. The movement of the ion(s) across the membrane is facilitated diffusion, and is coupled with the active transport of the molecule(s). In symport, two molecule move in a 'similar direction' at the 'same time'. For example, the movement of glucose along with sodium ions. It exploits the uphill movement of other molecules from low to high concentration, which is against the electrochemical gradient for the transport of solute molecules downhill from higher to lower concentration.

== Examples ==
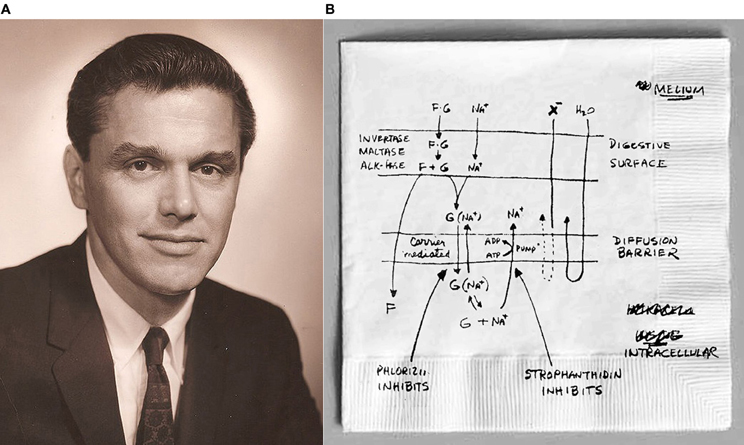
Robert K. Crane and his sketch of the sodium-glucose symporter

SGLT1 in the intestinal epithelium transports sodium ions (Na^{+}) and glucose across luminal membrane of the epithelial cells so that it can be absorbed into the bloodstream. This is the basis of oral rehydration therapy. If this symporter did not exist, individual sodium channels and glucose uniporters would not be able to transfer glucose against the concentration gradient and into the bloodstream.

Na^{+}/K^{+}/2Cl^{−} symporter in the loop of Henle in the renal tubules of the kidney transports 4 molecules of 3 different types; a sodium ion (Na^{+}), a potassium ion (K^{+}) and two chloride ions (2Cl^{−}). Loop diuretics such as furosemide (Lasix) act on this protein.

Marine invertebrates use symporters to transport against strong chemical gradients. Amino acids and sugars are taken up from sea water in the presence of extracellular sodium and is driven by the Na^{+}/K^{+}-ATPase pump.

In the roots of plants, the H^{+}/K^{+} symporters are only one member of a group of several symporters/antiporters that specifically allow only one charged hydrogen ion (more commonly known as a proton) and one charged K^{+} ion. This group of carriers all contribute to modulate the chemiosmotic potential inside the cell. Initially H^{+} is pumped into the area outside the root by H^{+}-ATPase. This change in both the pH and electrochemical potential gradient between the inside of the cell and the outside produces a proton-motive force, as the protons will want to naturally flow back into the area of low concentration and with a voltage closer to zero from their current situation of being in an area of high concentration of positively charged protons.

The reasons for this are twofold. For one, substances in nature have a tendency to move from areas of high concentration to areas of low concentration, as is evident by dropping a drop of food coloring in a glass of water. It does not aggregate, but begins to move from the highly concentrated areas (the colored areas) to the areas of low concentration (clear areas). Second, large groups of predominantly positively charged or negatively charged particles will naturally repel each other. This is demonstrated by attempting to push the two positive poles or two negative poles of a magnet together. Depending on the strength of the magnet, the repulsion may be so strong that it is impossible to push the magnets together unless aided by machinery. Proton-motive force does work on the system by bringing ions back towards the epidermis of the root or surface of a root hair along with the protons. From the surface of the soil/root interface, specific carriers, like H+/K+ symporters allow the specific ions to come into the cell and the out the plasmodesmata/symporters/antiporters of the side of the cell facing away from the soil so that the essential element can make its way up the plant to the area it is needed so that it may supply the plant with important nutrients that are vital to the plant's being able to reach maturity.

== See also ==
- Antiporter
- Cotransport
- Cotransporter
- Uniporter
- Dr. S. N. Dey and cholera toxin
