= SLC2A12 =

Protein-coding gene in humans

Identifiers
- Aliases: SLC2A12, GLUT12, GLUT8, solute carrier family 2 member 12
- External IDs: OMIM: 610372; MGI: 3052471; GeneCards: SLC2A12

Gene location (Human)
Chr.	Chromosome 6 (human)
Band	6q23.2	Start	133,987,581 bp
Band	6q23.2	End	134,052,624 bp

Gene location (Mouse)
Chr.	Chromosome 10 (mouse)
Band	10|10 A3	Start	22,520,910 bp
Band	10|10 A3	End	22,580,184 bp
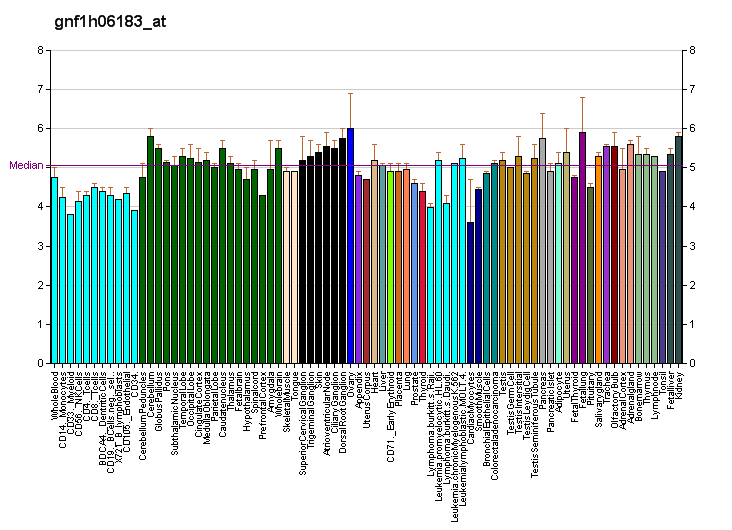

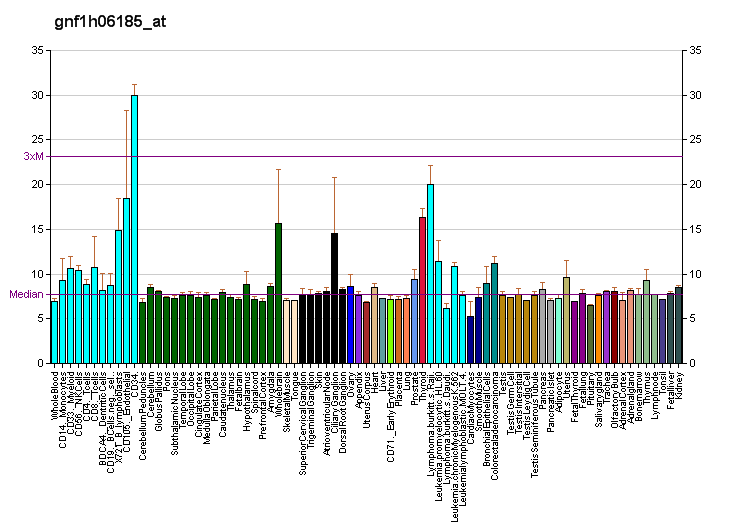

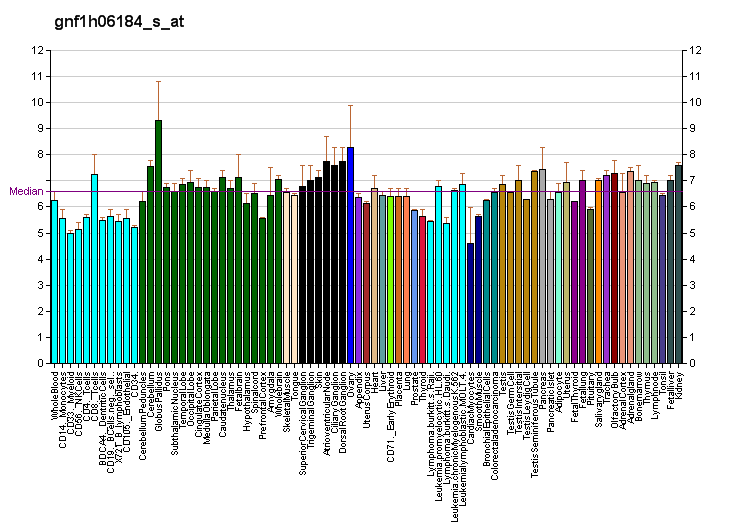
RNA expression pattern
Bgee	Human / Mouse (ortholog); Top expressed in: jejunal mucosa; retinal pigment epithelium; myocardium of left ventricle; buccal mucosa cell; duodenum; tail of epididymis; prostate; bronchial epithelial cell; epithelium of nasopharynx; body of stomach / Top expressed in: Epithelium of choroid plexus; gastrula; otic vesicle; lobe of prostate; secondary oocyte; retinal pigment epithelium; lumbar subsegment of spinal cord; zygote; stellate ganglion; greater petrosal nerve; More reference expression data
BioGPS	More reference expression data
Gene ontology
Molecular function	glucose transmembrane transporter activity; carbohydrate:proton symporter activity; transmembrane transporter activity; transporter activity; D-glucose transmembrane transporter activity
Cellular component	cytoplasm; perinuclear region of cytoplasm; integral component of membrane; plasma membrane; membrane; endomembrane system; integral component of plasma membrane
Biological process	carbohydrate transport; glucose import; transmembrane transport; hexose transmembrane transport; proton transmembrane transport; glucose transmembrane transport
Sources:Amigo / QuickGO
Orthologs
Databases	NCBI: entry; OMA: entry
Species	Human	Mouse
Entrez	154091	353169
Ensembl	ENSG00000146411	ENSMUSG00000037490
UniProt	Q8TD20	Q8BFW9
RefSeq (mRNA)	NM_145176	NM_178934
RefSeq (protein)	NP_660159	NP_849265
Location (UCSC)	Chr 6: 133.99 – 134.05 Mb	Chr 10: 22.52 – 22.58 Mb
PubMed search
- Wikidata
View/Edit Human	View/Edit Mouse

Solute carrier family 2, facilitated glucose transporter member 12 is a protein that in humans is encoded by the SLC2A12 gene.

== See also ==
- Glucose transporter
- Solute carrier family
