= SLC2A7 =

Protein-coding gene in humans

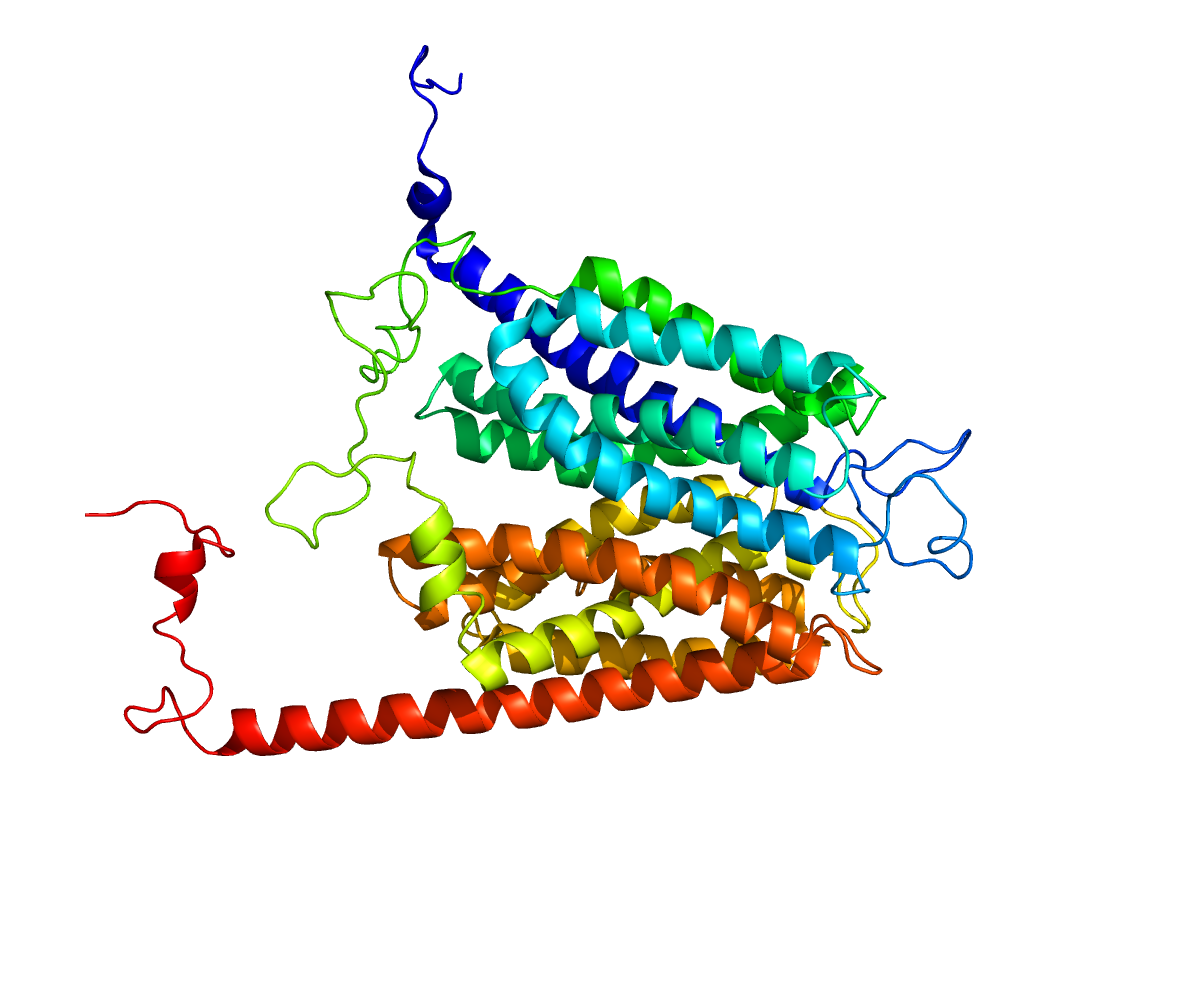

Identifiers
- Aliases: SLC2A7, GLUT7, solute carrier family 2 member 7, GLUT-7, hGLUT7
- External IDs: OMIM: 610371; MGI: 3650865; GeneCards: SLC2A7

Gene location (Human)
Chr.	Chromosome 1 (human)
Band	1p36.23	Start	9,002,973 bp
Band	1p36.23	End	9,026,423 bp

Gene location (Mouse)
Chr.	Chromosome 4 (mouse)
Band	4 E2|4	Start	150,233,429 bp
Band	4 E2|4	End	150,252,939 bp
RNA expression pattern
Bgee	Human / Mouse (ortholog); Top expressed in: duodenum; colon; smooth muscle tissue / Top expressed in: jejunum; duodenum; blastocyst; yolk sac; embryo; embryo; colon; ileum; placenta; spleen; More reference expression data
BioGPS	n/a
Gene ontology
Molecular function	transporter activity; transmembrane transporter activity; sugar transmembrane transporter activity
Cellular component	plasma membrane; membrane; integral component of membrane
Biological process	carbohydrate transport; transmembrane transport; hexose transmembrane transport
Sources:Amigo / QuickGO
Orthologs
Databases	NCBI: entry; OMA: entry
Species	Human	Mouse
Entrez	155184	435818
Ensembl	ENSG00000197241	ENSMUSG00000062064
UniProt	Q6PXP3	P0C6A1
RefSeq (mRNA)	NM_207420	NM_001085529; NM_001368869
RefSeq (protein)	NP_997303	NP_001078998; NP_001355798
Location (UCSC)	Chr 1: 9 – 9.03 Mb	Chr 4: 150.23 – 150.25 Mb
PubMed search
- Wikidata
View/Edit Human	View/Edit Mouse

Solute carrier family 2, facilitated glucose transporter member 7 also known as glucose transporter 7 (GLUT7) is a protein that in humans is encoded by the SLC2A7 gene.

SLC2A7 belongs to a family of transporters that catalyze the uptake of sugars through facilitated diffusion. This family of transporters shows conservation of 12 transmembrane helices as well as functionally significant amino acid residues.

== See also ==
- Glucose transporter
