= GLUT8 =

Protein found in humans

SLC2A8

Identifiers
- Aliases: SLC2A8, GLUT8, GLUTX1, solute carrier family 2 member 8
- External IDs: OMIM: 605245; MGI: 1860103; GeneCards: SLC2A8

Gene location (Human)
Chr.	Chromosome 9 (human)
Band	9q33.3	Start	127,397,138 bp
Band	9q33.3	End	127,408,424 bp

Gene location (Mouse)
Chr.	Chromosome 2 (mouse)
Band	2 B|2 22.09 cM	Start	32,863,002 bp
Band	2 B|2 22.09 cM	End	32,872,095 bp
RNA expression pattern
Bgee	Human / Mouse (ortholog); Top expressed in: left testis; right testis; right adrenal gland; left adrenal cortex; right adrenal cortex; muscle layer of sigmoid colon; right hemisphere of cerebellum; C1 segment; right lobe of liver; gastrocnemius muscle / Top expressed in: spermatocyte; parotid gland; ankle; seminiferous tubule; spermatid; motor neuron; seminal vesicula; right kidney; muscle of thigh; stroma of bone marrow; More reference expression data
BioGPS	n/a
Gene ontology
Molecular function	transmembrane transporter activity; transporter activity; carbohydrate:proton symporter activity; glucose binding; glucose transmembrane transporter activity; D-glucose transmembrane transporter activity
Cellular component	integral component of membrane; membrane; synaptic vesicle; plasma membrane; integral component of plasma membrane; lysosomal membrane; cytoplasmic vesicle membrane; cytoplasmic vesicle; clathrin-coated vesicle membrane
Biological process	insulin receptor signaling pathway; response to hypoxia; glucose transmembrane transport; male meiosis I; glucose import; carbohydrate transport; transmembrane transport; membrane organization; hexose transmembrane transport; transport; carbohydrate metabolic process; proton transmembrane transport
Sources:Amigo / QuickGO
Orthologs
Databases	NCBI: entry; OMA: entry
Species	Human	Mouse
Entrez	29988	56017
Ensembl	ENSG00000136856	ENSMUSG00000026791
UniProt	Q9NY64	Q9JIF3
RefSeq (mRNA)	NM_001271711; NM_001271712; NM_014580	NM_019488; NM_001356409
RefSeq (protein)	NP_001258640; NP_001258641; NP_055395	NP_062361; NP_001343338
Location (UCSC)	Chr 9: 127.4 – 127.41 Mb	Chr 2: 32.86 – 32.87 Mb
PubMed search
- Wikidata
View/Edit Human	View/Edit Mouse

GLUT8 is a protein that in humans is encoded by the gene SLC2A8. It is the eighth member of glucose transporter superfamily.

It is characterized by the presence of two leucine residues in its N-terminal intracellular domain, which influences intracellular trafficking.

== Discovery ==
GLUT8, originally named GLUTX1, was cloned almost simultaneously by two different groups.

== Subcellular localization ==
Where in the cell GLUT8 is localized in not yet clear. Most GLUT8 is not present at the cell surface. Some co-localization with both the endoplasmic reticulum and late endosomes/lysosomes has been published.

== Physiological role ==
GLUT8 function in vivo remains to be defined, despite suggestions that it may play a role in fertility, being expressed at high levels in testes and in the acrosomal part of spermatozoa. Furthermore, GLUT8 appears to play an important role in the energy metabolism of sperm cells.

GLUT8, when expressed in Xenopus oocytes, mediates glucose uptake with high affinity. Other hexoses are not good substrates of the transporter.

Mice devoid of both copies of the SLC2A8 gene are viable, fertile and do not show any obvious phenotype.
