= SLC2A14 =

Protein-coding gene in the species Homo sapiens

Identifiers
- Aliases: SLC2A14, GLUT14, SLC2A3P3, solute carrier family 2 member 14
- External IDs: OMIM: 611039; MGI: 95757; GeneCards: SLC2A14

Gene location (Human)
Chr.	Chromosome 12 (human)
Band	12p13.31	Start	7,812,512 bp
Band	12p13.31	End	7,891,148 bp

Gene location (Mouse)
Chr.	Chromosome 6 (mouse)
Band	6 F2|6 57.82 cM	Start	122,704,768 bp
Band	6 F2|6 57.82 cM	End	122,778,599 bp
RNA expression pattern
Bgee	Human / Mouse (ortholog); Top expressed in: left testis; right testis; gonad; testicle; right adrenal cortex; body of pancreas; left adrenal gland; blood; left adrenal cortex; bone marrow / Top expressed in: spermatocyte; primitive streak; spermatid; seminiferous tubule; granulocyte; yolk sac; blood; superior cervical ganglion; tail of embryo; otic placode; More reference expression data
BioGPS	n/a
Gene ontology
Molecular function	transmembrane transporter activity; glucose transmembrane transporter activity; transporter activity; D-glucose transmembrane transporter activity
Cellular component	integral component of membrane; membrane; nucleus; plasma membrane
Biological process	carbohydrate transport; multicellular organism development; cell differentiation; glucose transmembrane transport; transmembrane transport; spermatogenesis; transport
Sources:Amigo / QuickGO
Orthologs
Databases	NCBI: entry; OMA: entry
Species	Human	Mouse
Entrez	144195	20527
Ensembl	ENSG00000173262	ENSMUSG00000003153
UniProt	Q8TDB8	P32037
RefSeq (mRNA)	NM_001286233; NM_001286234; NM_001286235; NM_001286236; NM_001286237 NM_153449	NM_011401
RefSeq (protein)	NP_001273162; NP_001273163; NP_001273164; NP_001273165; NP_001273166 NP_703150	NP_035531
Location (UCSC)	Chr 12: 7.81 – 7.89 Mb	Chr 6: 122.7 – 122.78 Mb
PubMed search
- Wikidata
View/Edit Human	View/Edit Mouse

Solute carrier family 2 (facilitated glucose transporter), member 14 is a protein that in humans is encoded by the SLC2A14 gene.

Members of the glucose transporter (GLUT) family, including SLC2A14, are highly conserved integral membrane proteins that transport hexoses such as glucose and fructose into all mammalian cells. GLUTs show tissue and cell-type specific expression.
