= SLC2A6 =

Protein-coding gene in the species Homo sapiens

Identifiers
- Aliases: SLC2A6, GLUT6, GLUT9, HSA011372, solute carrier family 2 member 6
- External IDs: OMIM: 606813; MGI: 2443286; GeneCards: SLC2A6

Gene location (Human)
| Chr. | Chromosome 9 (human) |
| Band | 9q34.2 | Start | 133,471,094 bp |
| Band | 9q34.2 | End | 133,479,127 bp |

Gene location (Mouse)
| Chr. | Chromosome 2 (mouse) |
| Band | 2|2 A3 | Start | 26,911,375 bp |
| Band | 2|2 A3 | End | 26,918,010 bp |
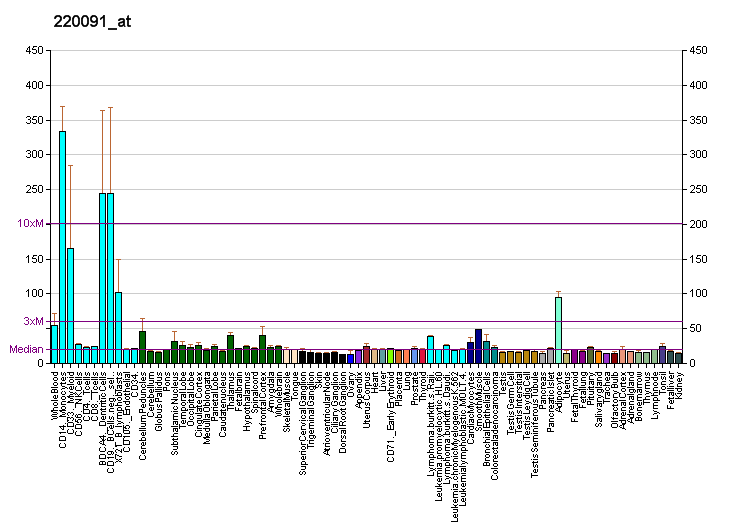
RNA expression pattern
| Bgee | Human / Mouse (ortholog); Top expressed in: granulocyte; monocyte; prefrontal cortex; right frontal lobe; primary visual cortex; Brodmann area 9; blood; superior frontal gyrus; anterior cingulate cortex; hypothalamus / Top expressed in: granulocyte; lumbar spinal ganglion; dentate gyrus of hippocampal formation granule cell; primary visual cortex; superior frontal gyrus; facial motor nucleus; blood; cerebellar cortex; morula; embryo; More reference expression data |
| BioGPS | More reference expression data |
Gene ontology
| Molecular function | glucose transmembrane transporter activity; carbohydrate:proton symporter activity; transmembrane transporter activity; transporter activity; D-glucose transmembrane transporter activity |
| Cellular component | integral component of membrane; plasma membrane; membrane; integral component of plasma membrane |
| Biological process | carbohydrate transport; glucose import; transmembrane transport; hexose transmembrane transport; proton transmembrane transport; glucose transmembrane transport |
Sources:Amigo / QuickGO
Orthologs
| Databases | NCBI: entry; OMA: entry |
| Species | Human | Mouse |
| Entrez | 11182 | 227659 |
| Ensembl | ENSG00000160326; ENSG00000281165 | ENSMUSG00000036067 |
| UniProt | Q9UGQ3 | Q3UDF0 |
| RefSeq (mRNA) | NM_001145099; NM_017585 | NM_001177627; NM_172659 |
| RefSeq (protein) | NP_001138571; NP_060055 | NP_001171098; NP_766247 |
| Location (UCSC) | Chr 9: 133.47 – 133.48 Mb | Chr 2: 26.91 – 26.92 Mb |
| PubMed search |
- Wikidata
| View/Edit Human | View/Edit Mouse |

Solute carrier family 2, facilitated glucose transporter member 6 is a protein that in humans is encoded by the SLC2A6 gene.

== Function ==
Hexose transport into mammalian cells is catalyzed by a family of membrane proteins, including SLC2A6, that contain 12 transmembrane domains and a number of critical conserved residues.[supplied by OMIM]

== See also ==
- Glucose transporter
- Solute carrier family
