= SLC2A13 =

Protein-coding gene in the species Homo sapiens

Identifiers
- Aliases: SLC2A13, HMIT, solute carrier family 2 member 13
- External IDs: OMIM: 611036; MGI: 2146030; GeneCards: SLC2A13

Gene location (Human)
Chr.	Chromosome 12 (human)
Band	12q12	Start	39,755,025 bp
Band	12q12	End	40,106,089 bp

Gene location (Mouse)
Chr.	Chromosome 15 (mouse)
Band	15|15 E3	Start	91,151,899 bp
Band	15|15 E3	End	91,457,464 bp
RNA expression pattern
Bgee	Human / Mouse (ortholog); Top expressed in: lateral nuclear group of thalamus; pars reticulata; endothelial cell; pars compacta; Brodmann area 23; Brodmann area 46; external globus pallidus; superior frontal gyrus; entorhinal cortex; middle temporal gyrus / Top expressed in: olfactory tubercle; suprachiasmatic nucleus; habenula; dorsal striatum; nucleus accumbens; subiculum; substantia nigra; medial dorsal nucleus; lateral septal nucleus; paraventricular nucleus of hypothalamus; More reference expression data
BioGPS	n/a
Gene ontology
Molecular function	transporter activity; carbohydrate:proton symporter activity; transmembrane transporter activity; glucose transmembrane transporter activity; myo-inositol:proton symporter activity
Cellular component	integral component of membrane; plasma membrane; membrane; integral component of plasma membrane
Biological process	glucose import; transmembrane transport; myo-inositol transport; proton transmembrane transport; hexose transmembrane transport; glucose transmembrane transport
Sources:Amigo / QuickGO
Orthologs
Databases	NCBI: entry; OMA: entry
Species	Human	Mouse
Entrez	114134	239606
Ensembl	ENSG00000151229	ENSMUSG00000036298
UniProt	Q96QE2	Q3UHK1
RefSeq (mRNA)	NM_052885	NM_001033633
RefSeq (protein)	NP_443117	NP_001028805
Location (UCSC)	Chr 12: 39.76 – 40.11 Mb	Chr 15: 91.15 – 91.46 Mb
PubMed search
- Wikidata
View/Edit Human	View/Edit Mouse

Proton myo-inositol cotransporter, also known as solute carrier family 2 member 13, is a protein that in humans is encoded by the SLC2A13 gene.
