= SLC2A11 =

Protein-coding gene in the species Homo sapiens

Identifiers
- Aliases: SLC2A11, GLUT10, GLUT11, solute carrier family 2 member 11
- External IDs: OMIM: 610367; GeneCards: SLC2A11

Gene location (Human)
Chr.	Chromosome 22 (human)
Band	22q11.23	Start	23,856,703 bp
Band	22q11.23	End	23,886,312 bp
RNA expression pattern
Bgee	Human / Mouse (ortholog); Top expressed in: right hemisphere of cerebellum; sural nerve; apex of heart; pituitary gland; body of pancreas; nucleus accumbens; anterior pituitary; left ventricle; hypothalamus; human kidney / n/a; More reference expression data
BioGPS	n/a
Gene ontology
Molecular function	transporter activity; transmembrane transporter activity; sugar transmembrane transporter activity
Cellular component	integral component of membrane; cell junction; plasma membrane; membrane; nucleus
Biological process	carbohydrate transport; transmembrane transport; hexose transmembrane transport
Sources:Amigo / QuickGO
Orthologs
Databases	NCBI: entry; OMA: entry
Species	Human	Mouse
Entrez	66035	n/a
Ensembl	ENSG00000275744; ENSG00000133460	n/a
UniProt	Q9BYW1	n/a
RefSeq (mRNA)	NM_001024938; NM_001024939; NM_001282864; NM_030807	n/a
RefSeq (protein)	NP_001020109; NP_001020110; NP_001269793; NP_110434	n/a
Location (UCSC)	Chr 22: 23.86 – 23.89 Mb	n/a
PubMed search		n/a
- Wikidata
View/Edit Human

Solute carrier family 2, facilitated glucose transporter member 11 (SLC2A11) also known as glucose transporter type 10/11 (GLUT-10/11) is a protein that in humans is encoded by the SLC2A11 gene.

SLC2A11 belongs to a family of plasma membrane proteins that mediate transport of sugars across the membrane by facilitative diffusion.
