= Fanconi–Bickel syndrome =

Glycogen storage disease

Fanconi–Bickel syndrome is a form of glycogen storage disease named for Guido Fanconi and Horst Bickel, who first described it in 1949.

It is associated with GLUT2, a glucose transport protein which, when functioning normally, allows glucose to exit several tissues, including the liver, nephrons, and enterocytes of the intestines, and enter the blood. The syndrome results in hepatomegaly secondary to glycogen accumulation, glucose and galactose intolerance, fasting hypoglycaemia, a characteristic proximal tubular nephropathy and severe short stature.
