= GLUT3 =

Protein found in humans

SLC2A3

Identifiers
- Aliases: SLC2A3, GLUT3, solute carrier family 2 member 3
- External IDs: OMIM: 138170; MGI: 95757; GeneCards: SLC2A3
Available structures
PDB	Ortholog search: PDBe RCSB
PDB	List of PDB id codes 4ZWB, 5C65, 4ZW9, 4ZWC

Gene location (Human)
Chr.	Chromosome 12 (human)
Band	12p13.31	Start	7,919,230 bp
Band	12p13.31	End	7,936,187 bp

Gene location (Mouse)
Chr.	Chromosome 6 (mouse)
Band	6 F2|6 57.82 cM	Start	122,704,768 bp
Band	6 F2|6 57.82 cM	End	122,778,599 bp
RNA expression pattern
Bgee	Human / Mouse (ortholog); Top expressed in: endothelial cell; vena cava; pericardium; saphenous vein; blood; monocyte; gallbladder; bone marrow; epithelium of colon; Brodmann area 23 / Top expressed in: spermatocyte; primitive streak; spermatid; seminiferous tubule; granulocyte; yolk sac; blood; superior cervical ganglion; tail of embryo; otic placode; More reference expression data
BioGPS	n/a
Gene ontology
Molecular function	glucose binding; transporter activity; transmembrane transporter activity; dehydroascorbic acid transmembrane transporter activity; glucose transmembrane transporter activity; D-glucose transmembrane transporter activity
Cellular component	integral component of membrane; plasma membrane; integral component of plasma membrane; extracellular exosome; membrane; secretory granule membrane; specific granule membrane; tertiary granule membrane; ficolin-1-rich granule membrane; cell projection; perikaryon
Biological process	L-ascorbic acid metabolic process; glucose transmembrane transport; carbohydrate transport; dehydroascorbic acid transport; transmembrane transport; neutrophil degranulation; transport; carbohydrate metabolic process
Sources:Amigo / QuickGO
Orthologs
Databases	NCBI: entry; OMA: entry
Species	Human	Mouse
Entrez	6515	20527
Ensembl	ENSG00000059804	ENSMUSG00000003153
UniProt	P11169	P32037
RefSeq (mRNA)	NM_006931	NM_011401
RefSeq (protein)	NP_008862	NP_035531
Location (UCSC)	Chr 12: 7.92 – 7.94 Mb	Chr 6: 122.7 – 122.78 Mb
PubMed search
- Wikidata
View/Edit Human	View/Edit Mouse

Glucose transporter 3 (or GLUT3), also known as solute carrier family 2, facilitated glucose transporter member 3 (SLC2A3) is a protein that in humans is encoded by the SLC2A3 gene. GLUT3 facilitates the transport of glucose across the plasma membranes of mammalian cells. GLUT3 is most known for its specific expression in neurons and has originally been designated as the neuronal GLUT. GLUT3 has been studied in other cell types with specific glucose requirements, including sperm, preimplantation embryos, circulating white blood cells and carcinoma cell lines.

== Discovery ==
GLUT3 was the third glucose transporter to be discovered, first cloned in 1988 from a fetal skeletal muscle cell line, using a GLUT1 cDNA probe and shown to share 64.4% identity with GLUT1.

== Function ==
Although GLUT3 was found to be expressed in various tissues, it is most specifically expressed in neurons, found predominantly in axons and dendrites and also, but less prominently, in the cell body. GLUT3 has at least a fivefold greater transport capacity than GLUT1 or GLUT4, as well as a higher glucose affinity than GLUT1, GLUT2 or GLUT4. This is significant as glucose levels surrounding the neurons are only 1–2 mM, compared to 5–6 mM in the serum.

=== Brain ===
Glucose delivery and use in the mammalian brain is mediated primarily by a high molecular weight form of GLUT1 in the blood–brain barrier, GLUT3 in neuronal populations and a less glycosylated form of GLUT1 in the remainder of the parenchyma. GLUT3 is considered the main but not the exclusive neuronal glucose transporter, whereas other glucose transporters have also been observed in neurons.

GLUT3 expression in neurons in the rat coincides with maturation and synaptic connectivity and a positive correlation between protein levels of GLUT1, GLUT3 and regional cerebral glucose use was observed in mouse.

The central role of GLUT3 in cerebral metabolism has been challenged by the astrocyte-neuron lactate shuttle (ANLS) hypothesis, which proposes that astrocytes play the key role in the coupling of neuronal activity and cerebral glucose use. In this hypothesis, the astrocyte, which relies on GLUT1 for glucose transport, is the primary consumer of glucose in the brain, providing lactate as the primary energetic fuel for neurons. However, by modeling the kinetic characteristics and glucose concentrations in neurons and glia, it was concluded that the glucose capacity of neurons via GLUT3 far exceeds that of astrocytes via GLUT1. Additionally, demonstrations of increase in GLUT3 expression associated with increased cerebral glucose use provides further confirmation of the central role of GLUT3.

=== Other tissues ===
Expression of GLUT3 is also found in sperm, embryos, white blood cells and carcinoma cell lines.

== Interactive pathway map ==
Click on genes, proteins and metabolites below to link to respective articles. (Note: The interactive pathway map can be edited at WikiPathways: "GlycolysisGluconeogenesis_WP534".)

Glycolysis and Gluconeogenesis edit
