= Robert K. Crane =

American biochemist (1919–2010)

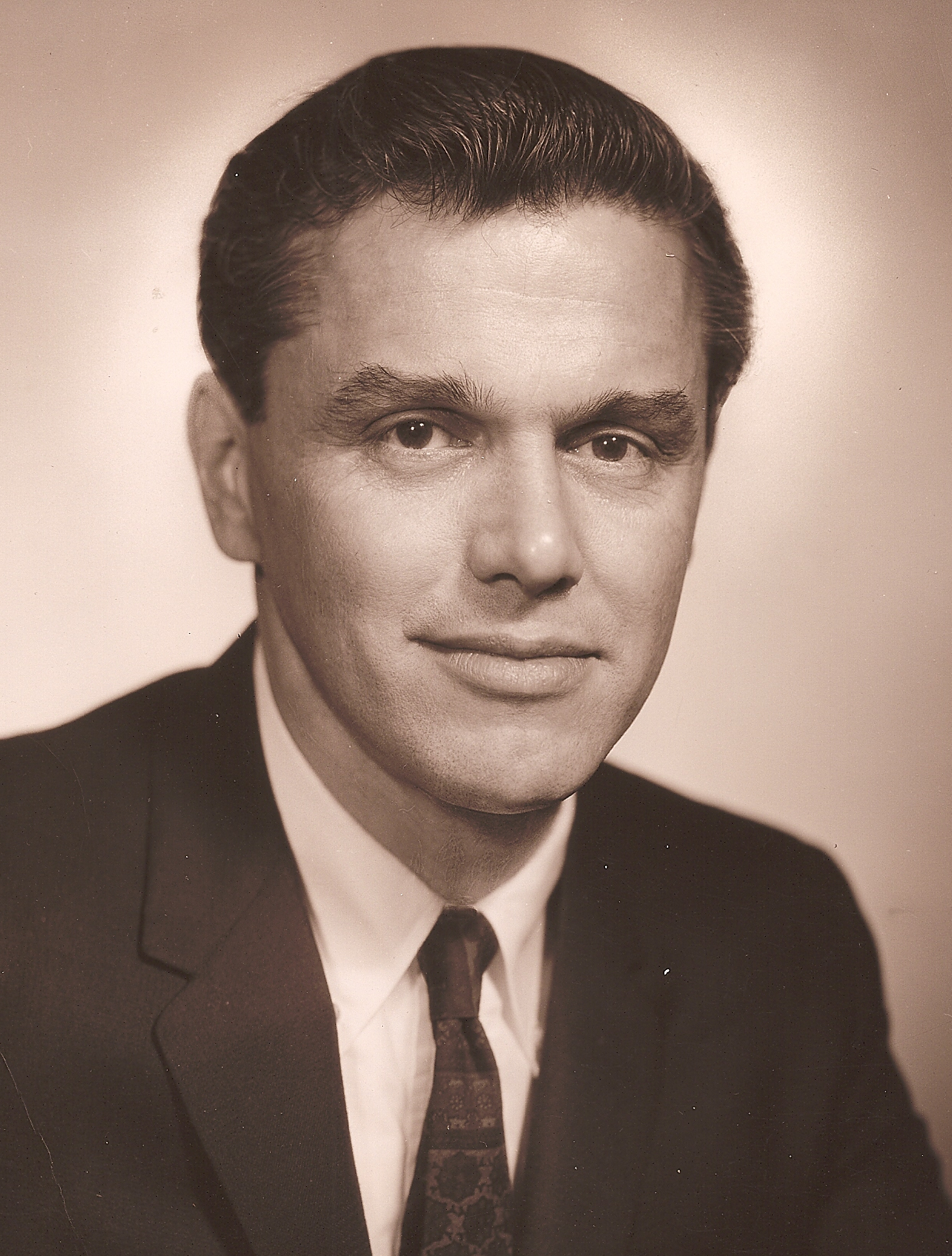
- Born: December 20, 1919; Palmyra, New Jersey, U.S.
- Died: October 31, 2010 (aged 90); Williston, Tennessee, U.S.
- Education: Washington College, Harvard
- Known for: Cotransport
- Relatives: Stephen Crane, novelist (greatuncle)
- Awards: American Gastroenterological Association Distinguished Achievement Award (1969); Dr. Harold Lamport Award, New York Academy of Sciences (1977)
- Scientific career
- Fields: Biochemistry
- Workplaces: Washington University in St. Louis; Chicago Medical School; Rutgers Medical School of the University of Medicine and Dentistry of New Jersey
- Doctoral advisor: Fritz Lipmann

Robert Kellogg Crane (December 20, 1919 – October 31, 2010) was an American biochemist best known for his discovery of sodium–glucose cotransport.

== Early life ==
Crane was born on December 20, 1919, in Palmyra, New Jersey, to Wilbur Fiske Crane, Jr. architect and engineer, and Mary Elizabeth McHale Crane. He is the grandson of Stephen Crane's brother Wilbur.

He received a B.S. from Washington College in 1942. After serving in the Navy during World War II, Crane studied in biochemistry with Eric Ball at Harvard from 1946 to 1949, then spent a year with Fritz Lipmann at Harvard Medical School, and received a Ph.D. in Medical Sciences in 1950.

== Career ==
He joined Carl Cori's Department of Biological Chemistry at Washington University School of Medicine in St. Louis, where he began his long interest in glucose metabolism and worked until 1962. After that, he was professor and chairman of the department of Biochemistry at the Chicago Medical School until 1966 and then became professor and chairman of the department of Physiology and Biophysics at Rutgers Medical School (now known as Robert Wood Johnson Medical School) of the University of Medicine and Dentistry of New Jersey until 1986. He received a Sc.D. from Washington College in 1982.

In the 1950s, Crane played a central role in establishing that glucose transport into the cell was the first step in glucose metabolism and its control. He demonstrated that neither the phosphorylation-dephosphorylation mechanism nor other covalent reactions accounted for glucose transport in the intestine.

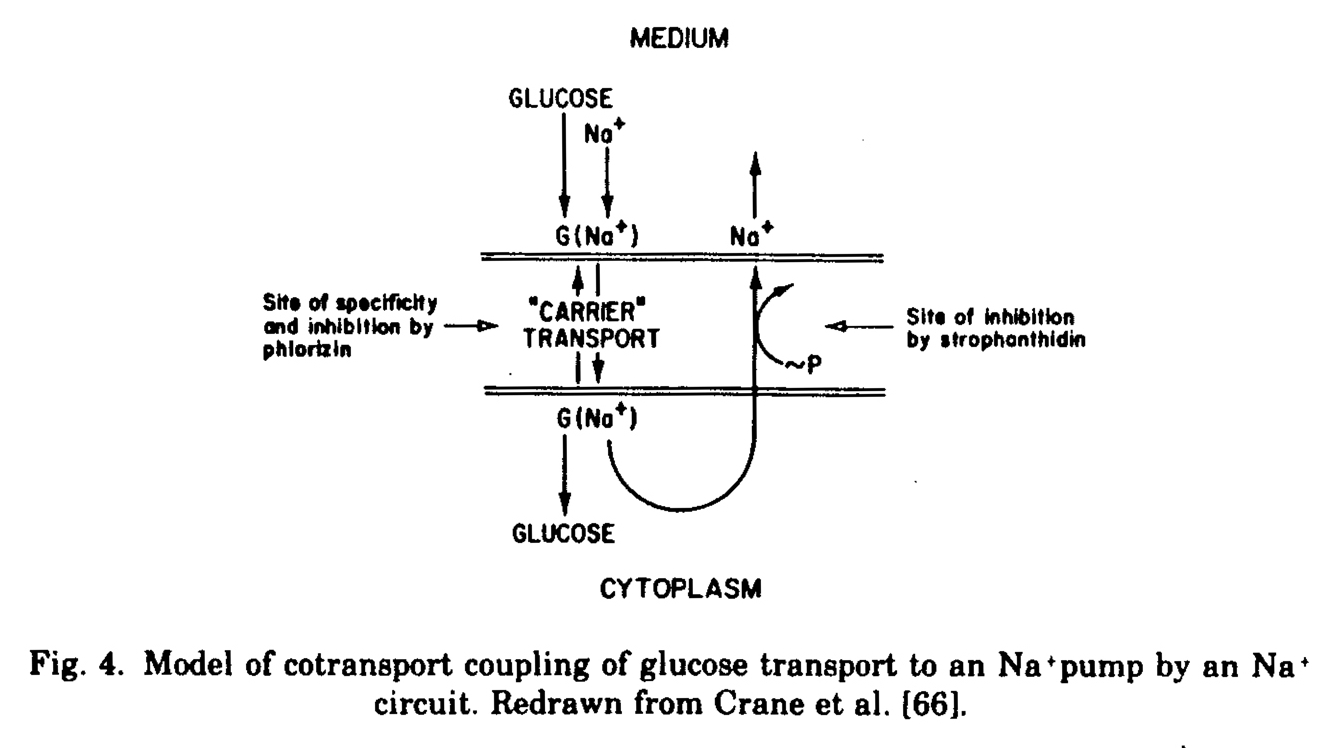
Model of cotransport coupling of glucose transport to an Na^{+} pump by an Na^{+} circuit. Redrawn from Crane et al.

In August 1960, in Prague, Crane presented for the first time his discovery of the sodium-glucose cotransport as the mechanism for intestinal glucose absorption. Cotransport was the first ever proposal of flux coupling in biology and was the most important event concerning carbohydrate absorption in the 20th century.

Crane's discovery of cotransport led directly to the development of oral rehydration therapy. This treatment counterbalances the loss of water and electrolytes caused by cholera via a glucose containing salt solution that accelerates water and electrolyte absorption. This is possible because cholera does not interfere with sodium-glucose cotransport.

Oral rehydration therapy saves the lives of millions of cholera patients in underdeveloped countries since the 1980s. In 1978, The Lancet wrote: "the discovery that sodium transport and glucose transport are coupled in the small intestine, so that glucose accelerates absorption of solute and water, was potentially the most important medical advance this century."

Crane's discovery is also used in blockbuster drugs, such as the SSRI Prozac, which treat depression by inhibiting the Na/serotonin cotransporters in the brain. Furthermore, major pharmaceutical companies are developing inhibitors of the Na/glucose cotransporters to treat diabetes and obesity.

== Awards and honors ==
- Distinguished Achievement Award, American Gastroenterological Association, 1969.
- Sir Arthur Hurst Memorial Lectureship, British Society of Gastroenterology, 1969.
- Gastrointestinal Section Lectureship, American Physiological Society, 1971.
- Dr. Harold Lamport Award, New York Academy of Sciences, 1977.
- Doctor of Science (honoris causa), Washington College, 1982.
- Honorary Chairman, International Symposium on the 25th Anniversary of the Gradient Hypothesis, Aussois, France, 18, 19 and 20 September 1985.

== Selected publications ==
- Robert K. Crane and Anna K. Keltch. "Dinitrocresol and phosphate stimulation of the oxygen consumption of a cell-free oxidative system obtained from sea urchin eggs". The Journal of General Physiology 32, 1949, pp. 503–509.
- Robert K. Crane and Eric G. Ball. "Factors affecting the fixation of C1402 by animal tissues". Journal of Biological Chemistry 188, 1951, pp. 819-832.
- Robert K. Crane and Eric G. Ball. "Relationship of C1402 fixation to carbohydrate metabolism in retina". Journal of Biological Chemistry 189, 1951, pp. 269–276.
- Robert K. Crane and Fritz Lipmann. "The relationship of mitochondrial phosphate to aerobic phosphate bond generation". Journal of Biological Chemistry 201, 1953, pp. 245–246.
- Robert K. Crane and Fritz Lipmann. "The effect of arsenate on aerobic phosphorylation". Journal of Biological Chemistry 201, 1953, pp. 235–243.
- Robert K. Crane and Alberto Sols. "The association of hexokinase with particulate fractions of brain and other tissue homogenates". Journal of Biological Chemistry 203, 1953, pp. 273–292.
- Alberto Sols and Robert K. Crane. "The inhibition of brain hexokinase by adenosinediphosphate and sulfhydryl reagents". Journal of Biological Chemistry 206, 1954, pp. 925–936.
- Robert K. Crane and Alberto Sols. "The non-competitive inhibition of brain hexokinase by glucose 6-phosphate and related compounds". Journal of Biological Chemistry 210, 1954, pp. 597–606.
- Alberto Sols and Robert K. Crane. "Substrate specificity of brain hexokinase". Journal of Biological Chemistry 210, 1954, pp. 581–595.
- Robert K. Crane, Richard A. Field and Carl F. Cori. "Studies of tissue permeability I. The penetration of sugars into Ehrlich ascites tumor cells". Journal of Biological Chemistry 224, 1957, pp. 649–662.
- Robert K. Crane and T. Hastings Wilson. "In vitro method for the study of the rate of intestinal absorption of sugars". Journal of Applied Physiology, Vol. 12, 1958, pp. 145–146.
- Stephen M. Krane and Robert K. Crane. "The accumulation of D-galactose against a concentration gradient by slices of rabbit kidney cortex". Journal of Biological Chemistry 234, 1959, pp. 211–216.
- Robert K. Crane. "Intestinal absorption of sugars". Physiological Reviews, Vol. 40, 1960, pp. 789–825.
- Robert K. Crane, D. Miller and I. Bihler. "The restrictions on possible mechanisms of intestinal transport of sugars”. In: Membrane Transport and Metabolism. Proceedings of a Symposium held in Prague, August 22–27, 1960. Edited by A. Kleinzeller and A. Kotyk. Czech Academy of Sciences, Prague, 1961, pp. 439–449.
- D. Miller and Robert K. Crane. "The digestive function of epithelium of the small intestine. 1. An intracellular locus of disaccharide and sugar phosphate ester hydrolysis". Biochimica et Biophysica Acta 52, 1961, pp. 281–293.
- Robert K. Crane. "Hypothesis for mechanism of intestinal active transport of sugars". Federation Proc. 21, 1962, pp. 891–895.
- David Miller and Robert K. Crane. "The digestion of carbohydrates in the small intestine". American Journal of Clinical Nutrition 12, 1963, pp. 220–227.
- Alexander Eichholz and Robert K. Crane. "Studies on the organization of the brush border in intestinal epithelial cells I. Tris density gradient disruption of isolated hamster brush borders and separation of fractions" Journal of Cell Biology 26, 1965, pp. 687–691.
- Jane Overton, Alexander Eichholz and Robert K. Crane. "Studies on the organization of the brush border in intestinal epithelial cells II. Fine structure of fractions of tris-disrupted hamster brush borders" Journal of Cell Biology 26, 1965, pp. 693–706.
- Robert K. Crane. "Structural and functional organization of an epithelial cell brush border". Intracellular Transport, Symp. Intnl. Soc. Cell BioI. Vol. 5, B. Warren, Ed., Academic Press, 1966, pp. 71–102.
- Alexander Eichholz, K. E. Howell and Robert K. Crane. "Studies on the organization of the brush border in intestinal epithelial cells VI. Glucose binding to isolated intestinal brush borders and their subfractions". Biochimica et Biophysica Acta 193, 1969, pp. 179–192.
- Robert K. Crane. "A perspective of digestive-absorptive function". American Journal of Clinical Nutrition 22, 1969, pp. 242–249.
- Robert K. Crane. "Speculations about mechanism: The ecstasy of transport". 21st annual meeting of the Gastrointestinal Section, American Physiological Society, 1971, pp. 1–16.
- Alexander Eichholz and Robert K. Crane. "Isolation of plasma membranes from intestinal brush borders in Methods in Enzymology". Vol. 31, part A, Biomembranes, S. Fleischer and L. Packer, Eds., Academic Press, 1974, pp. 123–134.
- Robert K. Crane. "The gradient hypothesis and other models of carrier-mediated active transport". Reviews of Physiology, Biochemistry and Pharmacology, Vol. 78, 1977, pp. 99–159.
- Robert K. Crane. "Digestion and absorption: water-soluble organics". International review of physiology, Gastrointestinal physiology II, Vol. 12, Robert K. Crane, Ed., University Park Press, 1977, pp. 325–365.
- Robert K. Crane. "Intestinal structure and function related to toxicity". Environmental Health Perspectives 33, 1979, pp. 3–8.
- Robert K. Crane. "The road to ion-coupled membrane processes". Comprehensive Biochemistry. Vol 35: Selected Topics in the History of Biochemistry, Personal Recollections l. (Neuberger, A., van Deenen, L. L. M. and Semenga, G., Eds.), Elsevier, Amsterdam, 1983, pp. 43–69.
- Robert K. Crane. "Questions". In: the proceedings of an International symposium on 25 years of Research on the Brush Border Membrane and Na^{+} gradient-coupled transport, Editors: Francisco Alvarado and others, INSERM symposium, No. 26, Elsevier-North Holland, Amsterdam, 1986, pp. 431–438.
- Robert K. Crane. "Robert Kellogg Crane: A Scientist Remembers". IUBMB Life, Volume 62, Issue 8, August 2010, pp. 642–645.

== See also ==
- Cotransport
- Cotransporter
- Sodium-glucose transport proteins
- Glucose transporter
- Oral rehydration therapy
