= GLUT2 =

Transmembrane carrier protein

SLC2A2

Identifiers
- Aliases: SLC2A2, GLUT2, solute carrier family 2 member 2
- External IDs: OMIM: 138160; MGI: 1095438; GeneCards: SLC2A2

Gene location (Human)
Chr.	Chromosome 3 (human)
Band	3q26.2	Start	170,996,347 bp
Band	3q26.2	End	171,026,743 bp

Gene location (Mouse)
Chr.	Chromosome 3 (mouse)
Band	3 A3|3 12.19 cM	Start	28,752,052 bp
Band	3 A3|3 12.19 cM	End	28,785,508 bp
RNA expression pattern
Bgee	Human / Mouse (ortholog); Top expressed in: right lobe of liver; jejunal mucosa; duodenum; mucosa of ileum; kidney tubule; testicle; islet of Langerhans; human kidney; glomerulus; metanephric glomerulus / Top expressed in: islet of Langerhans; left lobe of liver; yolk sac; human kidney; right kidney; duodenum; gallbladder; jejunum; primitive streak; epithelium of small intestine; More reference expression data
BioGPS	n/a
Gene ontology
Molecular function	transporter activity; transmembrane transporter activity; hexose transmembrane transporter activity; dehydroascorbic acid transmembrane transporter activity; glucose transmembrane transporter activity; D-glucose transmembrane transporter activity
Cellular component	brush border; cytoplasm; integral component of membrane; cell-cell junction; integral component of plasma membrane; apical plasma membrane; membrane; plasma membrane
Biological process	hexose transmembrane transport; dehydroascorbic acid transport; carbohydrate transport; regulation of insulin secretion; transmembrane transport; intestinal hexose absorption; carbohydrate metabolic process; glucose transmembrane transport
Sources:Amigo / QuickGO
Orthologs
Databases	NCBI: entry; OMA: entry
Species	Human	Mouse
Entrez	6514	20526
Ensembl	ENSG00000163581	ENSMUSG00000027690
UniProt	P11168	P14246
RefSeq (mRNA)	NM_000340; NM_001278658; NM_001278659	NM_031197
RefSeq (protein)	NP_000331; NP_001265587; NP_001265588	NP_112474
Location (UCSC)	Chr 3: 171 – 171.03 Mb	Chr 3: 28.75 – 28.79 Mb
PubMed search
- Wikidata
View/Edit Human	View/Edit Mouse

Glut2basal.png

Glucose transporter 2 (GLUT2) is a protein that in humans is encoded by the gene SLC2A2. GLUT2 is a transmembrane carrier protein that enables protein facilitated glucose movement across cell membranes. It is the principal transporter for transfer of glucose between liver and blood Unlike GLUT4, it does not rely on insulin for facilitated diffusion.

== Tissue distribution ==
GLUT2 is found in cellular membranes of:

- liver (Primary)
- pancreatic β cell (Primary in mice, tertiary in humans after GLUT1 and GLUT3)
- hypothalamus (Not overly significant)
- basolateral membrane of small intestine and apical GLUT2 is also suggested.
- basolateral membrane of renal tubular cells

== Function ==
GLUT2 has high capacity for glucose but low affinity (high K_{M}, ca. 15–20 mM) and thus functions as part of the "glucose sensor" in the pancreatic β-cells of rodents, though in human β-cells the role of GLUT2 seems to be a minor one. It is a very efficient carrier for glucose. Similarly, a recent study showed that lack of GLUT2 in β-cells doesn't impair glucose homeostasis or glucose-stimulated insulin secretion in mice.

GLUT2 also carries glucosamine and fructose.

When the glucose concentration in the lumen of the small intestine goes above 30 mM, such as occurs in the fed-state, GLUT2 is up-regulated at the brush border membrane, enhancing the capacity of glucose transport. Basolateral GLUT2 in enterocytes also aids in the transport of fructose into the bloodstream through glucose-dependent cotransport. Recent studies show that renal GLUT2 contributes to systemic glucose homeostasis by regulating glucose reabsorption. Lack of renal Glut2 reversed features of diabetes and obesity in mice. In addition, renal Glut2 deficiency caused knockdown of renal Sglt2 through the transcription factor Hnf1α.

== Clinical significance ==
Defects in the SLC2A2 gene are associated with a particular type of glycogen storage disease called Fanconi-Bickel syndrome.

In drug-treated diabetic pregnancies in which glucose levels in the woman are uncontrolled, neural tube and cardiac defects in the early-developing brain, spine, and heart depend upon functional GLUT2 carriers, and defects in the GLUT2 gene have been shown to be protective against such defects in rats. However, whilst a lack of GLUT2 adaptability is negative, it is important to remember the fact that the main result of untreated gestational diabetes appears to cause babies to be of above-average size, which may well be an advantage that is managed very well with a healthy GLUT2 status.

Maintaining a regulated osmotic balance of sugar concentration between the blood circulation and the interstitial spaces is critical in some cases of edema including cerebral edema.

GLUT2 appears to be particularly important to osmoregulation, and preventing edema-induced stroke, transient ischemic attack or coma, especially when blood glucose concentration is above average. GLUT2 could reasonably be referred to as the "diabetic glucose transporter" or a "stress hyperglycemia glucose transporter."

SLC2A2 was associated with clinical stages and independently associated with overall survival in patients with Hepatocellular carcinoma, and could be considered a new prognostic factor for HCC.

== Interactive pathway map ==
Click on genes, proteins and metabolites below to link to respective articles. (Note: The interactive pathway map can be edited at WikiPathways: "GlycolysisGluconeogenesis_WP534".)

Glycolysis and Gluconeogenesis edit

== See also ==
- Glucose transporter
