= GLUT1 =

Uniporter protein

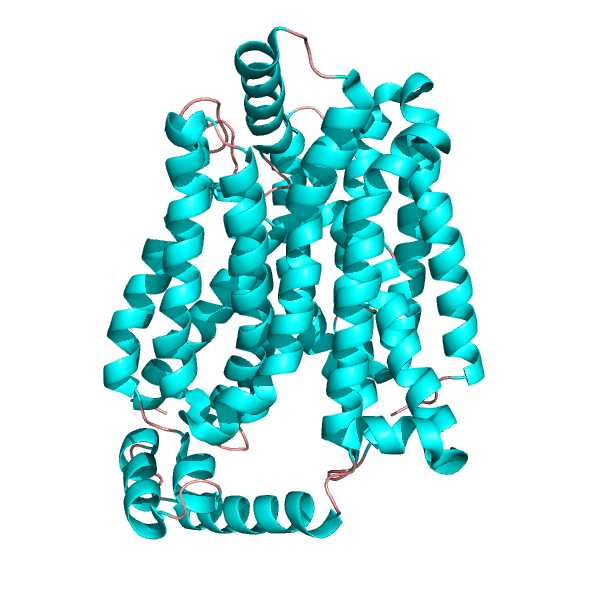

Identifiers
- Aliases: SLC2A1, CSE, DYT17, DYT18, DYT9, EIG12, GLUT, GLUT-1, GLUT1, GLUT1DS, HTLVR, PED, SDCHCN, solute carrier family 2 member 1
- External IDs: OMIM: 138140; MGI: 95755; GeneCards: SLC2A1
Available structures
PDB	Ortholog search: PDBe RCSB
PDB	List of PDB id codes 4PYP, 5EQH, 5EQI, 5EQG

Gene location (Human)
Chr.	Chromosome 1 (human)
Band	1p34.2	Start	42,925,353 bp
Band	1p34.2	End	42,958,893 bp

Gene location (Mouse)
Chr.	Chromosome 4 (mouse)
Band	4 D2.1|4	Start	118,965,908 bp
Band	4 D2.1|4	End	118,995,180 bp
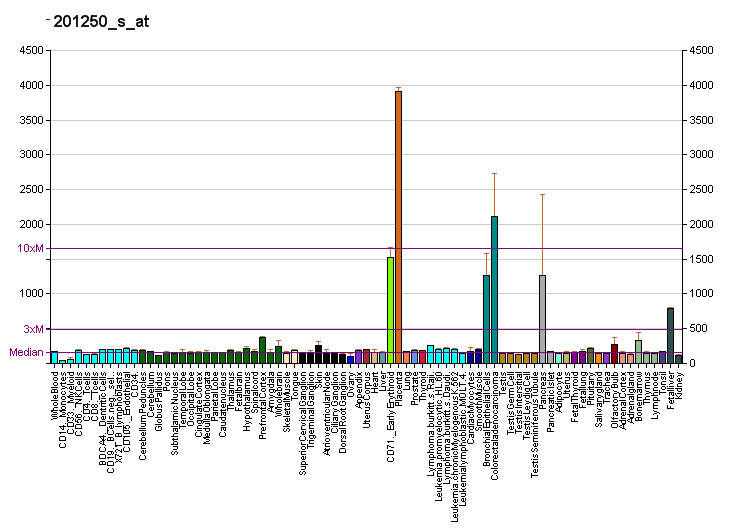

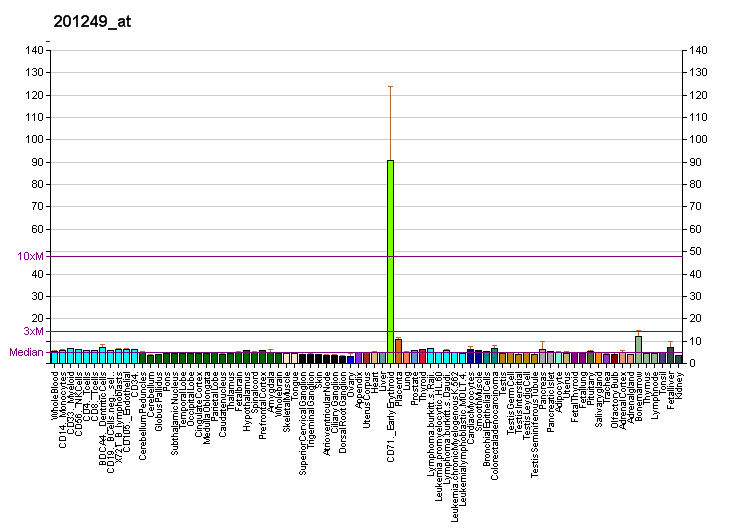
RNA expression pattern
Bgee	Human / Mouse (ortholog); Top expressed in: tibial nerve; sural nerve; skin of abdomen; skin of leg; retinal pigment epithelium; C1 segment; ectocervix; olfactory zone of nasal mucosa; endothelial cell; pancreatic ductal cell / Top expressed in: iris; retinal pigment epithelium; epithelium of lens; ciliary body; primitive streak; fetal liver hematopoietic progenitor cell; yolk sac; external carotid artery; cumulus cell; human fetus; More reference expression data
BioGPS	More reference expression data
Gene ontology
Molecular function	transmembrane transporter activity; xenobiotic transmembrane transporter activity; transporter activity; protein self-association; kinase binding; protein binding; identical protein binding; dehydroascorbic acid transmembrane transporter activity; glucose transmembrane transporter activity; D-glucose transmembrane transporter activity
Cellular component	cytoplasm; integral component of membrane; vesicle; cytosol; blood microparticle; membrane; cell-cell junction; melanosome; Golgi membrane; plasma membrane; integral component of plasma membrane; intracellular anatomical structure; female pronucleus; basolateral plasma membrane; midbody; apical plasma membrane; cortical actin cytoskeleton; caveola; membrane raft; extracellular exosome; intercalated disc; Z discdkac; sarcolemma
Biological process	L-ascorbic acid metabolic process; cellular response to glucose starvation; regulation of insulin secretion; xenobiotic transport; response to osmotic stress; lactose biosynthetic process; dehydroascorbic acid transport; carbohydrate transport; transmembrane transport; glucose transmembrane transport; female pregnancy; cerebral cortex development; response to insulin; cellular response to mechanical stimulus; cellular hyperosmotic response; response to Thyroglobulin triiodothyronine; regulation of glucose transmembrane transport; transport; response to hypoxia; protein-containing complex assembly
Sources:Amigo / QuickGO
Orthologs
Databases	NCBI: entry; OMA: entry
Species	Human	Mouse
Entrez	6513	20525
Ensembl	ENSG00000117394	ENSMUSG00000028645
UniProt	P11166	P17809
RefSeq (mRNA)	NM_006516	NM_011400
RefSeq (protein)	NP_006507	NP_035530
Location (UCSC)	Chr 1: 42.93 – 42.96 Mb	Chr 4: 118.97 – 119 Mb
PubMed search
- Wikidata
View/Edit Human	View/Edit Mouse

Glucose transporter 1 (or GLUT1), also known as solute carrier family 2, facilitated glucose transporter member 1 (SLC2A1), is a uniporter protein that in humans is encoded by the SLC2A1 gene. GLUT1 facilitates the transport of glucose across the plasma membranes of mammalian cells. This gene encodes a facilitative glucose transporter that is highly expressed in erythrocytes and endothelial cells, including cells of the blood–brain barrier. The encoded protein is found primarily in the cell membrane and on the cell surface, where it can also function as a receptor for human T-cell leukemia virus (HTLV) I and II. GLUT1 accounts for 2 percent of the protein in the plasma membrane of erythrocytes. During early development, GLUT1 expression is compartmentalized across different tissues, ensuring that metabolic requirements are met in a tissue-specific manner. This tissue-specific glucose metabolism is essential for regulating the differentiation of specific lineages, such as the epiblast to mesoderm transition during gastrulation. GLUT1's role in glucose uptake supports localized metabolic needs that interact with developmental signalling pathways to shape the emerging body plan.

Mutations in this gene can cause GLUT1 deficiency syndrome 1, GLUT1 deficiency syndrome 2, idiopathic generalized epilepsy 12, dystonia 9, and stomatin-deficient cryohydrocytosis. Disruption in GLUT1-mediated glucose transport can lead to defects in cell differentiation and morphogenesis.

== Discovery ==
GLUT1 was the first glucose transporter to be characterized. GLUT1 is highly conserved. GLUT1 of humans and mice have 98% identity at the amino acid level. GLUT1 is encoded by the SLC2 gene and is one of a family of 14 genes encoding GLUT proteins.

== Structure ==
The SLC2A1 gene is located on the p arm of chromosome 1 in position 34.2 and has 10 exons spanning 33,802 base pairs. The gene produces a 54.1 kDa protein composed of 492 amino acids. It is a multi-pass protein located in the cell membrane. This protein lacks a signal sequence; its C-terminus, N-terminus, and the very hydrophilic domain in the protein's center are all predicted to lie on the cytoplasmic side of the cell membrane.

GLUT1 behaves as a Michaelis–Menten enzyme and contains 12 membrane-spanning alpha helices, each containing 20 amino acid residues. A helical wheel analysis shows that the membrane-spanning alpha-helices are amphipathic, with one side being polar and the other side hydrophobic. Six of these membrane-spanning helices are believed to bind together in the membrane to create a polar channel in the center through which glucose can traverse, with the hydrophobic regions on the outside of the channel adjacent to the fatty acid tails of the membrane.

== Function ==
Energy-yielding metabolism in erythrocytes depends on a constant supply of glucose from the blood plasma, where the glucose concentration is maintained at about 5mM. Glucose enters the erythrocyte by facilitated diffusion via a specific glucose transporter, at a rate of about 50,000 times greater than uncatalyzed transmembrane diffusion. The glucose transporter of erythrocytes (called GLUT1 to distinguish it from related glucose transporters in other tissues) is a type III integral protein with 12 hydrophobic segments, each of which is believed to form a membrane-spanning helix. The detailed structure of GLUT1 is not known yet, but one plausible model suggests that the side-by-side assembly of several helices produces a transmembrane channel lined with hydrophilic residues that can hydrogen-bond with glucose as it moves through the channel.

GLUT1 is responsible for the low level of basal glucose uptake required to sustain respiration in most mammalian cells. Expression levels of GLUT1 in cell membranes are increased by reduced glucose levels and decreased by increased glucose levels.

GLUT1 also participates in cell signaling processes, particularly during embryogenesis, such as gastrulation. Specifically, by determining the baseline level of metabolic flux through glycolysis, it supports the cellular response to morphogens such as fibroblast growth factors (FGFs) and the downstream ERK pathways.

GLUT1 is also a major receptor for uptake of vitamin C as well as glucose, especially in non vitamin C producing mammals as part of an adaptation to compensate by participating in a Vitamin C recycling process. In mammals that do produce Vitamin C, GLUT4 is often expressed instead of GLUT1.

== Tissue distribution ==
GLUT1 expression occurs in almost all tissues, with the degree of expression typically correlating with the rate of cellular glucose metabolism. In the adult it is expressed at highest levels in erythrocytes and also in the endothelial cells of barrier tissues such as the blood–brain barrier.

== Clinical significance ==
Mutations in the GLUT1 gene are responsible for GLUT1 deficiency or De Vivo disease, which is a rare autosomal dominant disorder. This disease is characterized by a low cerebrospinal fluid glucose concentration (hypoglycorrhachia), a type of neuroglycopenia, which results from impaired glucose transport across the blood–brain barrier.

=== GLUT1 deficiency syndrome 1 ===
Many mutations in the SLC2A1 gene, including LYS456TER, TYR449TER, LYS256VAL, ARG126HIS, ARG126LEU and GLY91ASP, have been shown to cause GLUT1 deficiency syndrome 1 (GLUT1DS1), a neurologic disorder showing wide phenotypic variability. This disease can be inherited in either an autosomal recessive or autosomal dominant manner. The most severe 'classic' phenotype comprises infantile-onset epileptic encephalopathy associated with delayed development, acquired microcephaly, motor incoordination, and spasticity. Onset of seizures, usually characterized by apneic episodes, staring spells, and episodic eye movements, occurs within the first 4 months of life. Other paroxysmal findings include intermittent ataxia, confusion, lethargy, sleep disturbance, and headache. Varying degrees of cognitive impairment can occur, ranging from learning disabilities to severe mental retardation.

=== GLUT1 deficiency syndrome 2 ===
Other mutations, like GLY314SER, ALA275THR, ASN34ILE, SER95ILE, ARG93TRP, ARG91TRP, a 3-bp insertion (TYR292) and a 12-bp deletion (1022_1033del) in exon 6, have been shown to cause GLUT1 deficiency syndrome 2 (GLUT1DS2), a clinically variable disorder characterized primarily by onset in childhood of paroxysmal exercise-induced dyskinesia. The dyskinesia involves transient abnormal involuntary movements, such as dystonia and choreoathetosis, induced by exercise or exertion, and affecting the exercised limbs. Some patients may also have epilepsy, most commonly childhood absence epilepsy. Mild intellectual disability may also occur. In some patients involuntary exertion-induced dystonic, choreoathetotic, and ballistic movements may be associated with macrocytic hemolytic anemia. Inheritance of this disease is autosomal dominant.

=== Idiopathic generalized epilepsy 12 ===
Some mutations, particularly ASN411SER, ARG458TRP, ARG223PRO and ARG232CYS, have been shown to cause idiopathic generalized epilepsy 12 (EIG12), a disorder characterized by recurring generalized seizures in the absence of detectable brain lesions and/or metabolic abnormalities. Generalized seizures arise diffusely and simultaneously from both hemispheres of the brain. Seizure types include juvenile myoclonic seizures, absence seizures, and generalized tonic-clonic seizures. In some EIG12 patients seizures may remit with age. Inheritance of this disease is autosomal dominant.

=== Dystonia 9 ===
Another mutation, ARG212CYS, has been shown to cause Dystonia 9 (DYT9), an autosomal dominant neurologic disorder characterized by childhood onset of paroxysmal choreoathetosis and progressive spastic paraplegia. Most patients show some degree of cognitive impairment. Other variable features may include seizures, migraine headaches, and ataxia.

=== Stomatin-deficient cryohydrocytosis ===
Certain mutations, like GLY286ASP and a 3-bp deletion in ILE435/436, cause stomatin-deficient cryohydrocytosis with neurologic defects, a rare form of stomatocytosis characterized by episodic hemolytic anemia, cold-induced red cells cation leak, erratic hyperkalemia, neonatal hyperbilirubinemia, hepatosplenomegaly, cataracts, seizures, intellectual disability, and movement disorder. Inheritance of this disease is autosomal dominant.

=== Role as a receptor for HTLV ===
GLUT1 is also a receptor used by the HTLV virus to gain entry into target cells.

=== Role as a histochemical marker for hemangioma ===
Glut1 has also been demonstrated as a powerful histochemical marker for hemangioma of infancy

== Interactions ==
GLUT1 has been shown to interact with GIPC1. It is found in a complex with adducin (ADD2) and Dematin (EPB49) and interacts (via C-terminus cytoplasmic region) with Dematin isoform 2. It also interacts with SNX27; the interaction is required when endocytosed to prevent degradation in lysosomes and promote recycling to the plasma membrane. This protein interacts with STOM. It interacts with SGTA (via Gln-rich region) and has binary interactions with CREB3-2.

GLUT1 has two significant types in the brain: 45-kDa and 55-kDa. GLUT1 45-kDa is present in astroglia and neurons. GLUT1 55-kDa is present in the endothelial cells of the brain vasculature and is responsible for glucose transport across the blood–brain barrier; its deficiency causes a low level of glucose in CSF (less than 60 mg/dl) which may elicit seizures in deficient individuals.

Recently a GLUT1 inhibitor DERL3 has been described and is often methylated in colorectal cancer. In this cancer, DERL3 methylations seem to mediate the Warburg effect.

== Inhibitors ==
Fasentin is a small molecule inhibitor of the intracellular domain of GLUT1 preventing glucose uptake.

Recently, a new more selective GLUT1 inhibitor, Bay-876, has been described.

== Interactive pathway map ==
Click on genes, proteins and metabolites below to link to respective articles. (Note: The interactive pathway map can be edited at WikiPathways: "GlycolysisGluconeogenesis_WP534".)

Glycolysis and Gluconeogenesis edit
