= Amino acid transporter =

Membrane transport proteins

Transmembrane amino acid transporter protein

Identifiers
- Symbol: Aa_trans
- Pfam: PF01490
- InterPro: IPR013057
- TCDB: 2.A.18
- Membranome: 228
Available protein structures:
- PDB: IPR013057 PF01490 (ECOD; PDBsum)
- AlphaFold: IPR013057; PF01490

An amino acid transporter is a membrane transport protein that transports amino acids. They are mainly of the solute carrier family.

== Families ==
There are several families that function in amino acid transport, some of these include:

- TC# 2.A.3 - Amino Acid-Polyamine-Organocation (APC) Superfamily
- TC# 2.A.18 - Amino Acid/Auxin Permease (AAAP) Family
- TC# 2.A.23 - Dicarboxylate/Amino Acid:Cation (Na^{+} or H^{+}) Symporter (DAACS) Family
- TC# 2.A.26 - Branched Chain Amino Acid:Cation Symporter (LIVCS) Family
- TC# 2.A.42 - Hydroxy/Aromatic Amino Acid Permease (HAAAP) Family
- TC# 2.A.78 - Branched Chain Amino Acid Exporter (LIV-E) Family
- TC# 2.A.95 - 6TMS Neutral Amino Acid Transporter (NAAT) Family
- TC# 2.A.118 - Basic Amino Acid Antiporter (ArcD) Family
- TC# 2.A.120 - Putative Amino Acid Permease (PAAP) Family

== Solute carrier family examples ==
- (1) high affinity glutamate and neutral amino acid transporter
- (3) Heavy subunits of heteromeric amino acid transporters
- (6) Bacterial Leucine Transporter (LeuT)
- (7) cationic amino acid transporter/glycoprotein-associated
- (15) proton oligopeptide cotransporter
- (17) vesicular glutamate transporter
- (18) vesicular amine transporter
- (25) some mitochondrial carriers
- (26) multifunctional anion exchanger
- (32) vesicular inhibitory amino acid transporter
- (36) proton-coupled amino acid transporter
- (38) System A & N, sodium-coupled neutral amino acid transporter

=== VIAAT ===
Vesicular inhibitory amino acid transporter (VIAAT) is responsible for the storage of GABA and glycine in neuronal synaptic vesicles.

== Human proteins containing this domain ==
SLC32A1; SLC36A1; SLC36A2; SLC36A3; SLC36A4; SLC38A1; SLC38A2; SLC38A3; SLC38A4; SLC38A5; SLC38A6.

== See also ==
- Solute carrier family
- Amino acid transport
- Amino acid transport, acidic
- Amino acid transport, basic
- Amino acid transport disorder
- Amino acid
- Transporter Classification Database
