= CSTA =

CSTA may refer to:

- Center for SCREEN-TIME Awareness
- Computer Science Teachers Association
- Computer-supported telecommunications applications
- Council of Science and Technology Advisors - a Canadian S&T Committee
- Cystatin A, a protein
- Czech and Slovak Transatlantic Award
- Peptide Transporter Carbon Starvation Family, a family of transporter proteins
