= Sulfate permease =

Family of transport proteins

Identifiers
- Symbol: SulP
- Pfam: PF00916
- InterPro: IPR011547
- TCDB: 2.A.53
- OPM superfamily: 64
- OPM protein: 5da0
Available protein structures:
- PDB: IPR011547 PF00916 (ECOD; PDBsum)
- AlphaFold: IPR011547; PF00916

The sulfate permease (SulP) family (TC# 2.A.53) is a member of the large APC superfamily of secondary carriers. The SulP family is a large and ubiquitous family of proteins derived from archaea, bacteria, fungi, plants and animals. Many organisms including Bacillus subtilis, Synechocystis sp, Saccharomyces cerevisiae, Arabidopsis thaliana and Caenorhabditis elegans possess multiple SulP family paralogues. Many of these proteins are functionally characterized, and most are inorganic anion uptake transporters or anion:anion exchange transporters. Some transport their substrate(s) with high affinities, while others transport it or them with relatively low affinities. Others may catalyze SO^{2−}_{4}:HCO^{−}_{3} exchange, or more generally, anion:anion antiport. For example, the mouse homologue, SLC26A6 (TC# 2.A.53.2.7), can transport sulfate, formate, oxalate, chloride and bicarbonate, exchanging any one of these anions for another. A cyanobacterial homologue can transport nitrate. Some members can function as channels. SLC26A3 (2.A.53.2.3) and SLC26A6 (2.A.53.2.7 and 2.A.53.2.8) can function as carriers or channels, depending on the transported anion. In these porters, mutating a glutamate, also involved in transport in the CIC family (TC# 2.A.49), (E357A in SLC26A6) created a channel out of the carrier. It also changed the stoichiometry from 2Cl^{−}/HCO^{−}_{3} to 1Cl^{−}/HCO^{−}_{3}.

== Structure ==
All SulPs are homodimers. where two subunits do not function independently. The dimeric structure probably represents the native state of SulP transporters. A low-resolution structure of a bacterial SulP transporter revealed a dimeric stoichiometry, stabilized via its transmembrane core and mobile intracellular domains. The cytoplasmic STAS domain projects away from the transmembrane domain and is not involved in dimerization. The structure suggests that large movements of the STAS domain underlie the conformational changes that occur during transport.

The bacterial proteins vary in size from 434 residues to 573 residues with only a few exceptions. The eukaryotic proteins vary in size from 611 residues to 893 residues with a few exceptions. Thus, the eukaryotic proteins are usually larger than the prokaryotic homologues. These proteins exhibit 10-13 putative transmembrane α-helical spanners (TMSs) depending on the protein.

=== Crystal structures ===
Several crystal structures are available for members of the SulP family through RCSB:

PDB: 4DGF, 4DGH, 3LLO, 2KLN

== Homologues ==
One of the distant SulP homologues has been shown to be a bicarbonate:Na^{+} symporter (TC# 2.A.53.5.1). Bioinformatic work has identified additional homologues with fused domains. Some of these fused proteins have SulP homologues fused to carbonic anhydrase homologues (TC# 2.A.53.8.1). These are also presumed to be bicarbonate uptake permeases. Another has SulP fused to Rhodanese, a sulfate:cyanide sulfotransferase (TC# 2.A.53.9.1). This SulP homologue is presumably a sulfate transporter.

Homologues currently characterized in the SulP family can be found in the Transporter Classification Database.

=== SLC26A3 in mice ===
One member of the SulP family, SLC26A3, has been knocked out in mice. Apical membrane chloride/base exchange activity was sharply reduced, and the luminal content was more acidic in SLC26A3-null mouse colon. The epithelial cells in the colon displayed unique adaptive regulation of ion transporters; NHE3 expression was enhanced in the proximal and distal colon, whereas colonic H^{+}/K^{+}-ATPase and the epithelial sodium channel showed massive up-regulation in the distal colon. Plasma aldosterone was increased in SLC26A3-null mice. Thus, SLC26A3 may be the major apical chloride/base exchanger and is essential for the absorption of chloride in the colon. In addition, SLC26A3 regulates colonic crypt proliferation. Deletion of SLC26A3 results in chloride-rich diarrhea and is associated with compensatory adaptive up-regulation of ion-absorbing transporters.

=== MOT1 ===
MOT1 from Arabidopsis thaliana (TC# 2.A.53.11.1, 456aas; 8-10 TMSs), a distant homologue of the SulP and BenE (2.A.46) families, is expressed in both roots and shoots, and is localized to plasma membranes and intracellular vesicles. MOT1 is required for efficient uptake and translocation of molybdate as well as for normal growth under conditions of limited molybdate supply. Kinetic studies in yeast revealed that the K(m) value of MOT1 for molybdate is approximately 20 nM. Mo uptake by MOT1 in yeast is not affected by the presence of sulfate. MOT1 did not complement a sulfate transporter-deficient yeast mutant strain. MOT1 is thus probably specific for molybdate. The high affinity of MOT1 allows plants to obtain scarce Mo from soil when its concentration is about 10nM.

=== SLC26 ===
SLC26 proteins function as anion exchangers and Cl^{−} channels. Ousingsawat et al. (2012) examined the functional interaction between CF transmembrane conductance regulator (CFTR) and SLC26A9 in polarized airway epithelial cells and in non-polarized HEK293 cells expressing CFTR and SLC26A9 (2.A.56.2.10). They found that SLC26A9 provides a constitutively active basal Cl^{−} conductance in polarized grown CFTR-expressing CFBE airway epithelial cells, but not in cells expressing F508del-CFTR. In polarized CFTR-expressing cells, SLC26A9 also contributes to both Ca^{2+}- and CFTR-activated Cl^{−} secretion. In contrast in non-polarized HEK293 cells co-expressing CFTR/SLC26A9, the baseline Cl^{−} conductance provided by SLC26A9 was inhibited during activation of CFTR. Thus, SLC26A9 and CFTR behave differentially in polarized and non-polarized cells, explaining earlier conflicting data.

== Transport Reaction ==
The generalized transport reactions catalyzed by SulP family proteins are:

(1) SO^{2−}_{4} (out) + nH^{+} (out) → SO^{2−}_{4} (in) + nH^{+} (in).

(2) SO^{2−}_{4} (out) + nHCO^{−}_{3} (in) ⇌ SO^{2−}_{4} (in) + nHCO^{−}_{3} (out).

(3) I^{−} and other anions (out) ⇌ I^{−} and other anions (in).

(4) HCO^{−}_{3} (out) + nH^{+} (out) → HCO^{−}_{3} (in) + nH^{+} (in).

== See also ==
- Solute carrier family
- Transporter Classification Database
- Membrane transport protein
