= SLC25A22 =

Protein-coding gene in the species Homo sapiens

Identifiers
- Aliases: SLC25A22, EIEE3, GC1, NET44, GC-1, solute carrier family 25 member 22, DEE3
- External IDs: OMIM: 609302; MGI: 1915517; GeneCards: SLC25A22

Gene location (Human)
Chr.	Chromosome 11 (human)
Band	11p15.5	Start	790,475 bp
Band	11p15.5	End	798,281 bp

Gene location (Mouse)
Chr.	Chromosome 7 (mouse)
Band	7|7 F5	Start	141,009,657 bp
Band	7|7 F5	End	141,017,805 bp
RNA expression pattern
Bgee	Human / Mouse (ortholog); Top expressed in: right hemisphere of cerebellum; right frontal lobe; anterior cingulate cortex; body of pancreas; prefrontal cortex; amygdala; Brodmann area 9; anterior pituitary; nucleus accumbens; cerebellar vermis / Top expressed in: dentate gyrus of hippocampal formation granule cell; primary visual cortex; intestinal villus; superior frontal gyrus; neural layer of retina; cerebellar cortex; subiculum; piriform cortex; medial dorsal nucleus; left lobe of liver; More reference expression data
BioGPS	n/a
Gene ontology
Molecular function	symporter activity; L-glutamate transmembrane transporter activity; amino acid:proton symporter activity; high-affinity glutamate transmembrane transporter activity; L-aspartate transmembrane transporter activity; transmembrane transporter activity
Cellular component	membrane; mitochondrion; mitochondrial inner membrane; integral component of membrane
Biological process	transmembrane transport; L-glutamate transmembrane transport; ion transport; mitochondrial transport; proton transmembrane transport; aspartate transmembrane transport; malate-aspartate shuttle; L-aspartate transmembrane transport
Sources:Amigo / QuickGO
Orthologs
Databases	NCBI: entry; OMA: entry
Species	Human	Mouse
Entrez	79751	68267
Ensembl	ENSG00000177542	ENSMUSG00000019082
UniProt	Q9H936	Q9D6M3
RefSeq (mRNA)	NM_001191060; NM_001191061; NM_024698	NM_001177576; NM_026646; NM_001360723; NM_001360724
RefSeq (protein)	NP_001177989; NP_001177990; NP_078974	NP_001171047; NP_080922; NP_001347652; NP_001347653
Location (UCSC)	Chr 11: 0.79 – 0.8 Mb	Chr 7: 141.01 – 141.02 Mb
PubMed search
- Wikidata
View/Edit Human	View/Edit Mouse

Solute carrier family 25 member 22 is a protein that in humans is encoded by the SLC25A22 gene. This gene encodes a mitochondrial glutamate carrier. Mutations in this gene are associated with early infantile epileptic encephalopathy. Expression of this gene is increased in colorectal tumor cells.

== Structure ==
The SLC25A22 gene is located on the p arm of chromosome 11 in position 15.5 and has 9 exons spanning 7,807 base pairs. The gene produces a 34.5 kDa protein composed of 323 amino acids. The encoded protein is a multi-pass transmembrane protein located in the mitochondrial inner membrane.

== Function ==
The protein encoded by SLC25A22 is involved in the transport of glutamate, cotransported with H+, across the inner mitochondrial membrane. Both SLC25A22 and SLC25A18 are mitochondrial glutamate/H+ symporters.

== Clinical significance ==
=== Epileptic encephalopathy ===
Mutations in the SLC25A22 gene cause early infantile epileptic encephalopathy 3 (EIEE3), a severe form of epilepsy characterized by frequent tonic seizures or spasms beginning in infancy with a specific EEG finding of suppression-burst patterns, characterized by high-voltage bursts alternating with almost flat suppression phases. Epileptic encephalopathy early infantile type 3 is characterized by a very early onset, erratic and fragmentary myoclonus, massive myoclonus, partial motor seizures and late tonic spasms. The prognosis is poor, with no effective treatment, and children with the condition either die within 1 to 2 years after birth or survive in a persistent vegetative state.

Migrating partial seizures in infancy, caused by a specific G110R mutation in the SLC25A22 gene, can be inherited.

Although expression of SLC25A22 is high in most tissues, expression is particularly strong in the developing brain, with regions of the brain involved in the genesis and control of myoclonic seizures specifically expressing SLC25A22 during human development.

=== Colorectal cancer ===
SLC25A22 expression is increased in colorectal tumor tissues compared to matched nontumor colon tissues. Increased expression of the encoded protein was associated with decreased survival times in colorectal cancer patients. Knockdown of this gene in mutant colorectal cells decreased their migration, proliferation, and invasion.

== Interactions ==
The encoded protein interacts with SLC38A1, NDUFAF4, and 43 other proteins.
