= Natural resistance-associated macrophage protein =

Family of transport proteins

NRAMP family
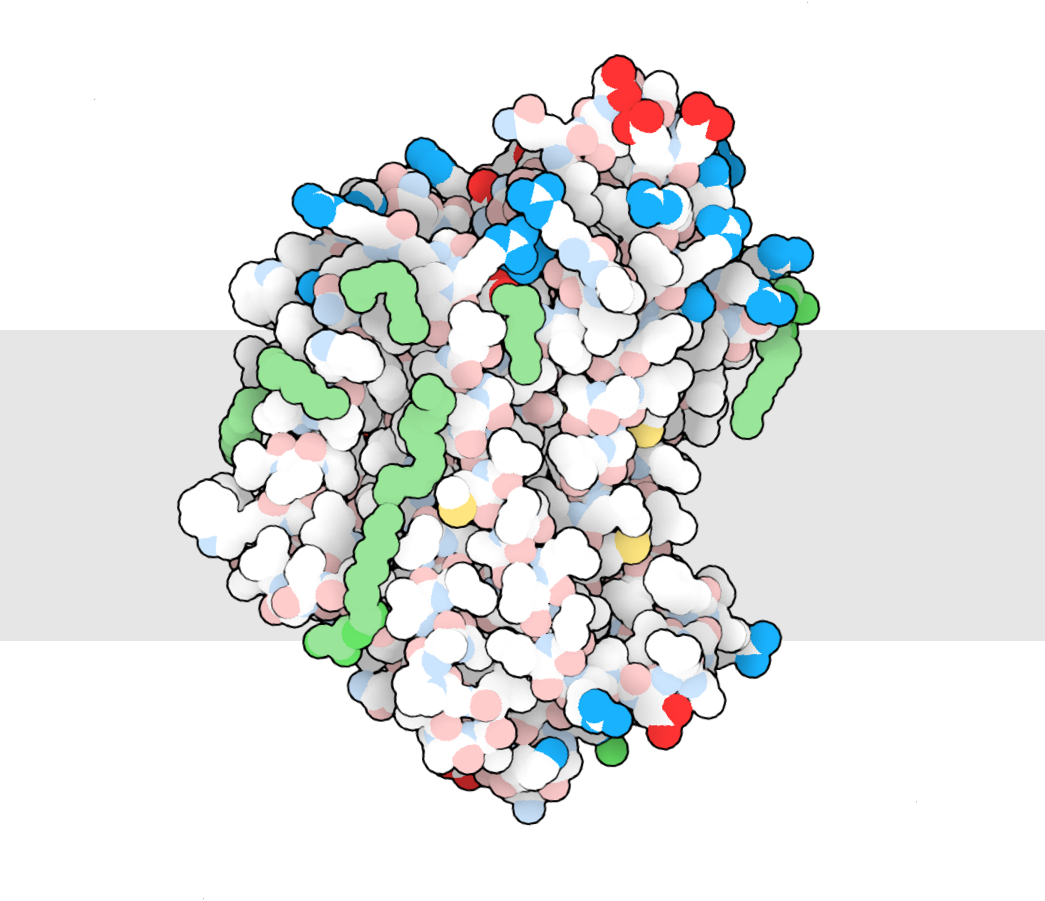

Identifiers
- Symbol: ?
- Pfam: PF01566
- TCDB: 2.A.55
- OPM superfamily: 64
- OPM protein: 4wgv
Available protein structures:
- PDB: 6BU5 PF01566 (ECOD; PDBsum)
- AlphaFold: PF01566

Natural resistance-associated macrophage proteins (Nramps), also known as metal ion (Mn^{2+}-iron) transporters (TC# 2.A.55), are a family of metal transport proteins found throughout all domains of life. Taking on an eleven-helix LeuT fold, the Nramp family is a member of the large APC Superfamily of secondary carriers. They transport a variety of transition metals such as manganese, cadmium, and manganese using an alternating access mechanism characteristic of secondary transporters.

The name "natural resistance-associated" macrophage proteins arises from the role in resistance of intracellular bacterial pathogens played by some animal homologs. Several human pathologies may result from defects in Nramp-dependent Fe^{2+} or Mn^{2+} transport, including iron overload, neurodegenerative diseases and innate susceptibility to infectious diseases.

== Human homologs ==
Humans and rodents possess two distinct Nramp proteins. The broad specificity NRAMP2 (DMT1) transports a range of divalent metal cations. Studies have shown that it transports Fe^{2+} and H^{+} with a 1:1 stoichiometry and apparent affinities of 6 μm and about 1 μm, respectively. Variable H^{+}:Fe^{2+} stoichiometry has also been reported. The order of substrate preference for NRAMP2 is:

Fe^{2+}> Zn^{2+}> Mn^{2+}> Co^{2+}> Ca^{2+}> Cu^{2+}> Ni^{2+}> Pb^{2+}

Many of these ions can inhibit iron absorption. Mutation of NRAMP2 in rodents leads to defective endosomal iron export within the ferritin cycle, impaired intestinal iron absorption and microcytic anemia. Symptoms of Mn^{2+} deficiency are also seen. It is found in apical membranes of intestinal epithelial cells but also in late endosomes and lysosomes.

In contrast to the widely expressed NRAMP2, NRAMP1 is expressed primarily in macrophages and monocytes and appears to have a preference for Mn^{2+} rather than Fe^{2+}. NRAMP1 (TC# 2.A.55.2.3) has been reported to function by metal:H^{+} antiport. It is hypothesized that a deficiency for Mn^{2+} or some other metal prevents the generation of reactive oxygenic and nitrogenic compounds that are used by macrophage to combat pathogens. This hypothesis is supported by studies on the bacterial Nramp homologs which exhibit extremely high selectivity for Mn^{2+} over Fe^{2+}, Zn^{2+} and other divalent cations. Regulation of these transporters in bacteria can occur through Fur, OxyR, and most commonly a DtxR homolog, MntR.

== Smf and other homologues ==
The Smf1 protein of Saccharomyces cerevisiae appears to catalyze high-affinity (K_{M} = 0.3 μm) Mn^{2+} uptake while the closely related Smf2 protein may catalyze low affinity (K_{M} = 60 μm) Mn^{2+} uptake in the same organism. Both proteins also mediate H^{+}-dependent Fe^{2+} uptake. These proteins are of 575 and 549 amino acyl residues in length and are predicted to have 8-12 transmembrane α-helical spanners. The E. coli homologue of 412 aas exhibits 11 putative and confirmed TMSs with the N-terminus in and the C-terminus out. The yeast proteins may be localized to the vacuole and/or the plasma membrane of the yeast cell. Indirect and some direct experiments suggest that they may be able to transport several heavy metals including Mn^{2+}, Cu^{2+}, Cd^{2+} and Co^{2+}. A third yeast protein, Smf3p, appears to be exclusively intracellular, possibly in the Golgi. NRAMP2 (Slc11A2) of Homo sapiens (TC# 2.A.55.2.1) has a 12 TMS topology with intracellular N- and C-termini. Two-fold structural symmetry in the arrangement of membrane helices for TM1-5 and TM6-10 (conserved Slc2 hydrophobic core) is suggested.

== Transport reaction ==
The generalized transport reaction catalyzed by NRAMP family proteins is:

Internal rearrangements during DraNramp conformational changes

Me^{2+} (out) + H^{+} (out) ⇌ Me^{2+} (in) + H^{+} (in).

== Structure and Mechanism ==
All Nramp proteins have eleven to twelve transmembrane helices, the first ten of which form a canonical LeuT fold, common throughout the APC superfamily. Metal uptake in Nramp proteins is typically stimulated by acidic pH and accompanied by proton influx, although many homologs have also shown proton uniport. This has been explained in the Deinococcus radiodurans homolog as the result of spatially segregated metal and proton pathways that rely on a longer-range allosteric connection rather than the direct structural connection seen in canonical symporters. Metal uptake requires alternating access bulk conformation change, in which the protein changes from an outward-open state to an inward-open state upon metal binding, while proton uptake can occur through a simpler channel-like mechanism.

== See also ==
- Solute carrier family
- Ferroportin
