= Sodium-solute symporter =

Group of transport proteins

Sodium:solute symporter family
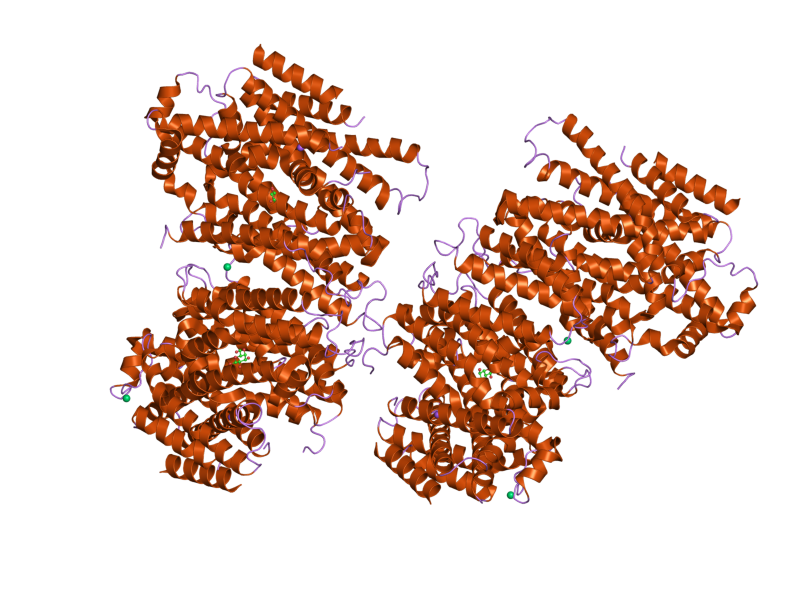
- Structure of Sodium/Sugar symporter with bound Galactose from vibrio parahaemolyticus.

Identifiers
- Symbol: SSF
- Pfam: PF00474
- InterPro: IPR001734
- PROSITE: PDOC00429
- TCDB: 2.A.21
- OPM superfamily: 64
- OPM protein: 3dh4
- CDD: cd10322
Available protein structures:
- PDB: 3dh4 IPR001734 PF00474 (ECOD; PDBsum)
- AlphaFold: IPR001734; PF00474

Members of the Solute:Sodium Symporter (SSS) Family (TC# 2.A.21) catalyze solute:Na^{+} symport. The SSS family is within the APC Superfamily. The solutes transported may be sugars, amino acids, organo cations such as choline, nucleosides, inositols, vitamins, urea or anions, depending on the system. Members of the SSS family have been identified in bacteria, archaea and eukaryotes. Almost all functional members normally catalyze solute uptake via Na^{+} symport.

== Function ==
Sodium/substrate symport (or co-transport) is a widespread mechanism of solute transport across cytoplasmic membranes of pro- and eukaryotic cells. The energy stored in an inwardly directed electrochemical sodium gradient, the sodium-motive force (SMF) is used to drive solute accumulation against a concentration gradient. The SMF is generated by primary sodium pumps (e.g. sodium/potassium ATPases, sodium translocating respiratory chain complexes) or via the action of sodium/proton antiporters. Sodium/substrate transporters are grouped in different families based on sequence similarities.

The human placental multivitamin symporter co-transports an anionic vitamin with two Na^{+}. In the rabbit Na^{+}:D-glucose co-transporter, SGLT1, the glucose translocation pathway probably involves TMSs 10-13, and the binding site for the inhibitor, phlorizin, involves loop 13 (residues 604-610). Cation binding in the N-terminal domain may induce transport-related conformational changes. A conserved tyrosine in the first transmembrane segment of solute:sodium symporters is involved in Na^{+}-coupled substrate co-transport. Mechanistic aspects of Na^{+} binding sites in LeuT-like fold symporters has been discussed in detail.

== Substrate affinity in humans ==
In the human homologue (hSGLT1), H^{+} can replace Na^{+}, but the apparent affinity for glucose reduces 20x from 0.3 mM to 6 mM. The apparent affinity for H^{+} is 6 μM, 1000x higher than for Na^{+} (6 mM). The transport stoichiometry is 1 glucose to 2 Na^{+} or H^{+}. If Asp204 is replaced by glutamate (D204E), the apparent affinity for H^{+} increases >20x with no change in apparent Na^{+} affinity. The D204N or D204C mutation promotes phlorizin-sensitive H^{+} currents that are 10x greater than Na^{+} currents, and the glucose:H^{+} stoichiometry is then as great as 1:145. The mutant system thus behaves as a glucose-gated H^{+} channel.

== Structure ==
Proteins of the SSS vary in size from about 400 residues to about 700 residues and probably possess thirteen to fifteen putative transmembrane helical spanners (TMSs). They generally share a core of 13 TMSs, but different members of the family have different numbers of TMSs. A 13 TMS topology with a periplasmic N-terminus and a cytoplasmic C-terminus has been experimentally determined for the proline:Na^{+} symporter, PutP, of E. coli. Residues important for substrate and Na^{+} binding in PutP are found in TMSs 2, 7 and 9 as well as in adjacent loops. A 14 TMS topology with periplasmic N- and C-termini has been established for the Vibrio parahaemolyticus SglT carrier. SglT transports sugar:Na with a 1:1 stoichiometry. However, MctP of Rhizobium leguminosarum may take up monocarboxylates via an H^{+} symport mechanism as a dependency on Na^{+} could not be demonstrated and uptake was strongly inhibited by 10 μM CCP.

Faham et al., (2008) reported the crystal structure of a member of the solute:sodium symporter (SSS) family, the Vibrio parahaemolyticus sodium:galactose symporter, vSGLT (2XQ2, 3DH4). The approximately 3.0 angstrom structure contains 14 transmembrane α-helices in an inward-facing conformation with a core structure of inverted repeats of 5 TM helices (TM2 to TM6 and TM7 to TM11). Galactose is bound in the center of the core, occluded from the outside solutions by hydrophobic residues. The architecture of the core is similar to that of the leucine transporter (LeuT) (TC# 2.A.22.4.2) from the NSS family. Modeling the outward-facing conformation based on the LeuT structure, in conjunction with biophysical data, provided insight into structural rearrangements for active transport.

Some bacterial sensor kinases (e.g., 2.A.21.9.1) have N-terminal, 12 TMS, sensor domains that regulate the C-terminal kinase domains. The latter are homologous to the kinase domain of NtrB and other sensor kinases. The N-terminal sensor domains are homologous, but distantly related to members of the SSS. The closest homologues are PutP of E. coli (2.A.21.2.1) and PanF of E. coli (2.A.21.1.1). Homologous regulatory domains are found in Agrobacterium, Mesorhizobium, Sinorhizobium, Vibrio cholerae and Bacillus species. While it is clear that these domains function as sensors, it is not known if they also transport the small molecules they sense.

== Transport reaction ==
The generalized transport reaction usually catalyzed by the members of this family is:

solute (out) + nNa+  (out) → solute (in) + nNa+  (in).

An ordered binding model of sodium/substrate transport suggests that sodium binds to the empty transporter first, thereby inducing a conformational alteration which increases the affinity of the transporter for the solute. The formation of the ternary complex induces another structural change that exposes sodium and substrate to the other site of the membrane. Substrate and sodium are released, and the empty transporter re-orientates in the membrane, allowing the cycle to start again.

== Subfamilies ==
Proteins belonging to the SSS family can be found in the Transporter Classification Database.

- Sodium/pantothenate symporter InterPro: IPR011849
- Sodium/proline symporter InterPro: IPR011851
- Cation/acetate symporter ActP InterPro: IPR014083

== Human proteins containing this domain ==
AIT; SLC5A1; SLC5A10; SLC5A11; SLC5A12; SLC5A2; SLC5A3; SLC5A4; SLC5A5; SLC5A6; SLC5A7; SLC5A8; SLC5A9

== See also ==
- APC Superfamily
- Transporter Classification Database
- Crystal structures:
  - Structure of the K294A mutant of vSGLT (2010): PDB: 2XQ2
  - Crystal Structure of Sodium/Sugar symporter with bound Galactose from vibrio parahaemolyticus (2008): PDB: 3DH4
