= Cation-chloride cotransporter =

The cation-chloride cotransporter (CCC) family (TC# 2.A.30) is part of the APC superfamily of secondary carriers. Members of the CCC family are found in animals, plants, fungi and bacteria. Most characterized CCC family proteins are from higher eukaryotes, but one has been partially characterized from Nicotiana tabacum (a plant), and homologous ORFs have been sequenced from Caenorhabditis elegans (worm), Saccharomyces cerevisiae (yeast) and Synechococcus sp. (blue green bacterium). The latter proteins are of unknown function. These proteins show sequence similarity to members of the APC family (TC #2.A.3). CCC family proteins are usually large (between 1000 and 1200 amino acyl residues), and possess 12 putative transmembrane spanners flanked by large N-terminal and C-terminal hydrophilic domains.

== Function ==
CCC family proteins can catalyze NaCl/KCl symport, NaCl symport, or KCl symport depending on the system. The NaCl/KCl symporters are specifically inhibited by bumetanide while the NaCl symporters are specifically inhibited by thiazide. One member of the CCC family, the thiazide-sensitive NaCl cotransporter of humans, is involved in 5% of the filtered load of NaCl in the kidney. Mutations in the NaCl cotransporter cause the recessive Gitelman syndrome. It is regulated by RasGRP1.

== Roles in nervous system ==
CCC plays a key role in chloride homeostasis. During the day, NKCC is active, leading to Cl⁻ influx, and GABA receptor activation may result in Cl⁻ efflux, causing depolarization and excitatory signaling. At night, NKCC is inactive. KCC becomes active, exporting K⁺ and Cl⁻, thereby reducing [Cl⁻]_{i}. Lower [Cl⁻]_{i} enhances Cl⁻ influx upon GABA binding, hyperpolarizing the membrane and promoting inhibitory signaling. This chloride oscillation demonstrates the circadian rhythm of neuronal excitability.

== NaCCC2 ==
Insects express two groups of sodium-dependent cation chloride cotransporters, including NKCCs and NaCCC2. Insect NKCCs and vertebrate NKCCs are directly the same ortholog, but NaCCC2 has no vertebrate ortholog. However, these transporters share high sequence similarity, but NaCCC2 demonstrates electrogenic transport behavior. NaCCC2 family members, including aeCCC2 from Aedes aegypti and Ncc83 (also called aeCCC3) from Drosophila, are expressed in osmoregulatory tissues, including Malpighian tubules and hindgut, where they function in ion secretion and absorption, and contribute to whole-body ion balance. Compared with the traditional electroneutral transport behavior in CCC family groups, aeCCC2 and Ncc83 demonstrates a strong preference for transporting Na and Li, carrying positive or negative ions across the membrane. This electrogenic behavior suggests a unique role in sodium homeostasis and osmoregulation in insects.

== Transport reaction ==
The generalized transport reaction for CCC family symporters is:

{Na^{+} + K^{+} + 2Cl^{−}} (out) ⇌ {Na^{+} + K^{+} + 2Cl^{−}} (in).

That for the NaCl and KCl symporters is:

{Na^{+} or K^{+} + Cl^{−}} (out) ⇌ {Na^{+} or K^{+} + Cl^{−}} (in).

== Structure ==
The NaCl cotransporter proteins are dimers in the membrane and contain 12 transmembrane spanners.

Two splice variants of NKCC2 are identical except for a 23 aa membrane domain. They have different affinities for Na^{+}, K^{+} and Cl^{−}. This segment (residues 216–233 in NKCC2) were examined for ion selectivity. Residue 216 affects K^{+} binding while residue 220 only affects Na^{+} binding. These two sites are presumed to be adjacent to each other.

Each of the major types of CCC family members in mammals exist as paralogous isoforms. These may differ in substrates transported. For example, of the four currently recognized KCl transporters, KCC1 and KCC4 both recognize KCl with similar affinities, but KCC1 exhibits anion selectivity: Cl^{−} > SCN^{−} = Br^{−} > PO^{3−}_{4} > I^{−,} while KCC4 exhibits anion selectivity: Cl^{−} > Br^{−} > PO^{3−}_{4} = I^{−} > SCN^{−}. Both are activated by cell swelling under hypotonic conditions. These proteins may cotransport water (H_{2}O).

CCCs share a conserved structural scaffold that consists of a transmembrane transport domain followed by a cytoplasmic regulatory domain. Warmuth et al. (2009) determined the x-ray structure of the C-terminal domain of a CCC from the archaeon Mehanosarcina acetivorans (PDB: 3G40). It shows a novel fold of a regulatory domain, distantly related to universal stress proteins. The protein forms dimers in solution, consistent with the proposed dimeric organization of eukaryotic CCC transporters.

AeCCC2 and Ncc83 are structurally members of the CCC family. Although aeCCC2 remains the conserved CCC structure, it holds a distinct ion-transport mechanism that differs from conventional vertebrate NKCC and KCC cotransporters. Furthermore, aeCCC2 and Ncc83 transporters share a similar gene structure. Both transporters have a similar length of nine predicted coding exons and high sequence identity across each exon. AeCCC2 holds around two-fold higher levels in tubules than in anal papillae. In contrast, Ncc83 is expressed nearly 100-fold more abundantly in anal papillae than in tubules.

== Clinical relevance ==
=== Neurological disorders ===
==== Huntington disease ====
Huntington's disease (HD) is a neurodegenerative disorder that involves alterations in neuronal pathways. The inhibitory-to-excitatory shift in GABAergic transmission is an important change, which is largely related to the disruption of chloride homeostasis. The NKCC1 inhibitor bumetanide helps to lower the intracellular chloride levels and restores inhibitory GABAergic signaling. In Huntington’s disease mouse models, treatment with bumetanide successfully restored GABAergic inhibition and improved hippocampal-dependent learning and memory.

==== Down syndrome ====
Down syndrome is a genetic disorder characterized by altered hippocampal-related functions, including deficits in memory, learning, and cognitive ability. In the Down syndrome mouse model that replicated the main features of the human condition, abnormalities were found in synaptic plasticity and exhibition/inhibition imbalance in neurotransmission. For CCC expression, NKCC1 was unregulated in the hippocampus, leading to elevated intracellular chloride levels, and GABA causes depolarization. This alteration of GABAergic signaling contributes to impaired long-term potentiation (LTP). Treatment with GABA_{a} antagonists improved the long term potentiation and cognitive deficit in Down syndrome mouse models.

==== Alzheimer disease ====
Alzheimer's disease is a neurodegenerative disorder with the loss of hippocampus neurons, presenting as memory loss and cognitive impairment. Alterations in NKCC1 expression have been proposed as mechanisms underlying impaired inhibitory signaling in Alzheimer's disease. In mouse model, NKCC1 is unregulated in hippocampus. This finding is consistent with Huntington's disease and suggest that restoring chloride homeostasis through CCC may help hippocampal-dependent learning and memory in Alzheimer disease.

=== Neuropsychiatric disorders ===
==== Schizophrenia ====
Schizophrenia is a neuropsychiatric disorder, consisting with positive (hallucinations), negative symptoms (withdrawal and lack of motivation) and cognitive symptoms (problem with focus, memory and executive function). GABAergic interneurons are diverse into different population and their different neuronal connections are important for coordinated development and brain regions' function. The dysregulation of KCC2 and NKCC1 have been observed in schizophrenia in the prefrontal cortex and may impact the exhibition and inhibition switch in patients.

==== Bipolar disorder ====
Bipolar disorder is a mental health illness that cause extreme mood swing, including emotional high (mania), and emotional low (depression). Na⁺/K⁺-ATPase generated sodium gradient, which are essential for the function of Na⁺-driven cotransporters, and disturbances in sodium handling have been implicated in bipolar disorder. Patients with bipolar disorder show evidence of impaired Na⁺/K⁺-ATPase activity and altered sodium signaling.

== See also ==
- APC Superfamily
- SLC12A9
- SLC12A8
- Chloride potassium symporter 5
- Transporter Classification Database
