= NCS1 =

NCS1 may refer to:

- National Comorbidity Survey
- Neuronal calcium sensor-1, encoded by the NCS1 gene
- Nucleobase cation symporter-1
