= AGCS family =

Family of transport proteins

Alanine/glycine:cation symporter (AGCS) family protein

Identifiers
- Symbol: A3P053
- Pfam: PF01235
- InterPro: IPR001463
- PROSITE: PS00873
- TCDB: 2.A.25
Available protein structures:
- PDB: IPR001463 PF01235 (ECOD; PDBsum)
- AlphaFold: IPR001463; PF01235

Members of the Alanine or Glycine:Cation Symporter (AGCS) Family (TC# 2.A.25) transport alanine and/or glycine in symport with Na^{+} and or H^{+}.

== Structure and function ==
Known proteins in the AGCS family are between 445 and 550 amino acyl residues in length and possess 8 to 12 putative transmembrane α-helical spanners. Members may possess 11 transmembrane segments (TMSs), as seems to be true for DagA (TC# 2.A.25.1.1) and AgcS (TC# 2.A.25.1.3), although Acp (TC# 2.A.25.1.2) has only 8 TMSs, perhaps the result of truncation. As of early 2016, there does not appear to be any 3D crystal structure data available for these proteins. Members of the AGCS family have been found in bacteria and archaea, such as extremophile halotolerant cyanobacterium Aphanothece halophytica, and thermophilic bacteria, Bacillus PS3. As of 2015, only three members of the family have been functionally characterized. These proteins show limited sequence similarity in the APC family (TC# 2.A.3). High-resolution structures of AgcS from Methanococcus maripaludis were obtained using X-ray crystallography and released in 2019 and show structural homology to other members of the Amino acid-Polyamine-Organocation superfamily of transporters.

=== Transport reaction ===
The generalized transport reaction catalyzed by the AGCS family is:

alanine or glycine (out) + Na^{+} or H^{+} (out) → alanine or glycine (in) + Na^{+} or H^{+} (in).

== Proteins in the AGCS family ==
There are currently 10 proteins belonging to the AGCS family. These proteins and their descriptions can be found in the Transporter Classification Database.
