= Betaine transporter =

Family of transport proteins

BCCT family transporter
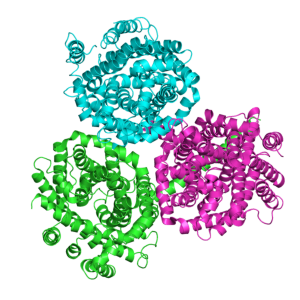
- BetP (betaine transporter) from Cornyebacterium glutamicum. PDB 3p03

Identifiers
- Symbol: BCCT
- Pfam: PF02028
- InterPro: IPR000060
- TCDB: 2.A.15
- OPM superfamily: 64
- OPM protein: 4ain
Available protein structures:
- PDB: IPR000060 PF02028 (ECOD; PDBsum)
- AlphaFold: IPR000060; PF02028

The Betaine/Carnitine/Choline Transporter (BCCT) family proteins are found in Gram-negative and Gram-positive bacteria and archaea. The BCCT family members a large group of secondary transporters, the APC superfamily. Their common functional feature is that they all transport molecules with a quaternary ammonium group [R-N (CH_{3})_{3}]. The BCCT family proteins vary in length between 481 and 706 amino acyl residues and possess 12 putative transmembrane α-helical spanners (TMSs). The x-ray structures reveal two 5 TMS repeats, with the total TMSs being 10. These porters catalyze bidirectional uniport or are energized by pmf-driven or smf-driven proton or sodium ion symport, respectively, or substrate: substrate antiport. Some of these permeases exhibit osmosensory and osmoregulatory properties inherent to their polypeptide chains.

== Structure ==
The structures of the sodium-independent carnitine/butyrobetaine antiporter CaiT from Proteus mirabilis (PmCaiT) (4M8J) and E. coli (EcCaiT)(3HFX) were determined.

Most members of the BCCT family are Na^{+}- or H^{+}-dependent, whereas EcCaiT is a Na^{+}- and H^{+}-independent substrate: product antiporter. The three-dimensional architecture of CaiT resembles that of the Na^{+}-dependent transporters LeuT and BetP, but in CaiT, methionine sulphur takes the place of the Na^{+} to coordinate the substrate in the central transport site, accounting for Na^{+} independence. Both CaiT structures (SWSW, 4M8J) show the fully open, inward-facing conformation and thus complete the set of functional states that describe the alternating access mechanism. EcCaiT (SWSX, 3HFX) contains two bound butyrobetaine substrate molecules, one in the central transport site and the other in an extracellular binding pocket. In the structure of PmCaiT, a tryptophan side chain occupies the transport site, and access to the extracellular site is blocked. The binding of both substrates to CaiT reconstituted into proteoliposomes is cooperative, with Hill coefficients of up to 1.7, indicating that the extracellular site is regulatory. Schulze et al. (2010) proposed a mechanism whereby the occupied regulatory site increases the binding affinity of the transport site and initiates substrate translocation. Glycine betaine transporters have been found to contain a conserved region with four tryptophans in their central region.

== Function ==
Most secondary-active transporters transport their substrates using an electrochemical ion gradient, but the carnitine transporter (CaiT) is an ion-independent, L-carnitine/gamma-butyrobetaine antiporter. Crystal structures of CaiT from E. coli and Proteus mirabilis revealed the inverted five-transmembrane-helix repeat similar to that in the amino acid/Na^{+} symporter, LeuT. Kalayil et al. (2013) showed that mutations of arginine 262 (R262) made CaiT Na^{+}-dependent with increased transport activity in the presence of membrane potential, in agreement with substrate/Na^{+} cotransport. R262 also plays a role in substrate binding by stabilizing the partly unwound TM1' helix.

Modeling CaiT from P. mirabilis in the outward-open and closed states on the corresponding structures of the related symporter BetP revealed alternating orientations of the buried R262 side chain, which mimic sodium binding and unbinding in the Na^{+}-coupled substrate symporters. A similar mechanism may be operative in other Na^{+}/H^{+}-independent transporters, in which a positively charged amino acid replaces the cotransporter cation. The oscillation of the R262 side chain in CaiT indicates how a positive charge triggers the change between outward-open and inward-open conformations.

== Transport reactions ==
The generalized transport reactions catalyzed by members of the BCCT family are:

Substrate (out) + nH^{+} (out) → Substrate (in) + nH^{+} (in)

Substrate (out) + Na^{+} (out) → Substrate (in) + Na^{+} (in)

Substrate-1 (out) + Substrate-2 (in) → Substrate-1 (in) + Substrate-2 (out)

Substrate (out) ⇌ Substrate (in)

Substrate = a quaternary amine

== Other betaine transporters ==
- The mammalian betaine transporter: Sodium- and chloride-dependent betaine transporter

== See also ==
- Betaine
- Carnitine
- Choline
- Transporter Classification Database
