= Putative amino acid permease family =

The putative amino acid permease (PAAP) family (TC# 2.A.120) belongs to the APC superfamily. The PAAP family consists of many proteins, all of a uniform topology with a 5 + 5 TMS repeat in a 2 + 3 + 2 + 3 arrangement. These proteins show similarity to members of the LIVCS family (TC# 2.A.26) in the APC Superfamily. A representative list of recognized members of the PAAP family is available in the Transporter Classification Database.
