= Congenital chloride diarrhea =

Genetic gastrointestinal disorder

- Other names: Darrow Gamble syndrome
- This condition is inherited via autosomal recessive manner.
- Symptoms: High volume diarrhea High chloride concentration in stool (>90mmol/L) Low chloride excretion in the urine Hypochloremic alkalosis and hypokalemia
- Causes: Mutation in the SLC26A3 gene

Congenital chloride diarrhea (CCD, also congenital chloridorrhea or Darrow Gamble syndrome) is a genetic disorder due to an autosomal recessive mutation of the SLC26A3 gene on chromosome 7. The mutation is in downregulated-in-adenoma (DRA), a gene that encodes a membrane protein of intestinal cells. The protein belongs to the solute carrier 26 family of membrane transport proteins. More than 20 mutations in the gene are known to date. A rare disease, CCD occurs in all parts of the world but is more common in some populations with genetic founder effects, most notably in Finland.

== Symptoms and signs ==
Chronic diarrhoea starting from early neonatal period. Failure to thrive is usually accompanying diarrhea.

== Pathophysiology ==
CCD causes persistent secretory diarrhea. In a fetus, it leads to polyhydramnios and premature birth. Immediately after birth, it leads to dehydration, hypoelectrolytemia, hyperbilirubinemia, abdominal distention, and failure to thrive.

== Diagnosis ==
CCD may be detectable on prenatal ultrasound. After birth, signs in affected babies typically are abdominal distension, visible peristalsis, and watery stools persistent from birth that show chloride loss of more than 90 mmol/L. An important feature in this diarrhea that helps in the diagnosis, is that it is the only type of diarrhea that causes metabolic alkalosis rather than metabolic acidosis.

== Treatment ==
Available treatments address the symptoms of CCD, not the underlying defect. Early diagnosis and aggressive salt replacement therapy result in normal growth and development, and generally good outcomes. Replacement of NaCl and KCl has been shown to be effective in children.

== History ==
Observations leading to the characterization of the SLC26 family were based on research on rare human diseases. Three rare recessive diseases in humans have been shown to be caused by genes of this family. Diastrophic dysplasia, congenital chloride diarrhea, and Pendred syndrome are caused by the highly related genes SLC26A2 (first called DTDST), SLC26A3 (first called CLD or DRA), and SLC26A4 (first called PDS), respectively. Two of these diseases, diastrophic dysplasia and congenital chloride diarrhea, are Finnish heritage diseases.
