= Nucleobase cation symporter-1 =

Permease for cytosine/purines, uracil, thiamine, allantoin

Identifiers
- Symbol: Transp_cyt_pur
- Pfam: PF02133
- InterPro: IPR001248
- TCDB: 2.A.39
- OPM superfamily: 64
- OPM protein: 2x79
- CDD: cd10323
Available protein structures:
- PDB: IPR001248 PF02133 (ECOD; PDBsum)
- AlphaFold: IPR001248; PF02133

The Nucleobase:Cation Symporter-1 (NCS1) Family (TC# 2.A.39) consists of over 1000 currently sequenced proteins derived from Gram-negative and Gram-positive bacteria, archaea, fungi and plants. These proteins function as transporters for nucleobases including purines and pyrimidines. Members of this family possess twelve transmembrane α-helical spanners (TMSs). At least some of them have been shown to function in uptake by substrate:H^{+} symport mechanism.

== Phylogeny ==
The bacterial and yeast proteins are widely divergent and do not cluster closely on the NCS1 family phylogenetic tree. B. subtilis possesses two paralogues of the NCS1 family, and S. cerevisiae has several. Two of the yeast proteins (Dal4 (TC# 2.A.39.3.1) and Fur4 (TC# 2.A.39.3.2)) cluster tightly together. Three other S. cerevisiae proteins, one of which is the thiamin permease, Thi10 (TC# 2.A.39.4.1), and another of which is the nicotinamide riboside transporter, Nrt1 (TC# 2.A.39.4.2), also cluster tightly together. The latter three proteins are likely to be closely related thiamin permease isoforms. The yeast cytosine-purine and vitamin B6 transporters cluster loosely together (24% identity; e-50). The bacterial proteins are derived from several Gram-negative and Gram-positive species. These proteins exhibit limited sequence similarity with the xanthine permease, PbuX (TC# 2.A.39.4.1), of Bacillus subtilis which is a member of the NCS2 family.

== Structure and function ==
Proteins of the NCS1 family are 419-635 amino acyl residues long and possess twelve putative transmembrane α-helical spanners (TMSs). At least some of them have been shown to function in uptake by substrate:H^{+} symport. In these respects, and with respect to substrate specificity, these proteins resemble the symporters of the NCS2 family, providing further evidence that the two families represent distant constituents of a single superfamily, the APC Superfamily. The two families probably arose by an early gene duplication event that occurred long before divergence of the three major kingdoms of life. It is possible that they are distant constituents of the MFS (2.A.1).

The nucleobase-cation-symport-1 (NCS1) transporters are essential components of salvage pathways for nucleobases and related metabolites. Weyand et al. (2008) reported the 2.85-angstrom resolution structure of the NCS1 benzyl-hydantoin transporter, Mhp1 (TC# 2.A.39.3.6), from Microbacterium liquefaciens. This structure (and related structures) are available through RCSB (PDB: 2JLN, 2X79, 4D1A, 4D1B, 4D1C, 4D1D). Mhp1 contains 12 transmembrane helices, 10 of which are arranged in two inverted repeats of five helices. The structures of the outward-facing open and substrate-bound occluded conformations were solved, showing how the outward-facing cavity closes upon binding of substrate. Comparisons with the leucine transporter LeuT(Aa) and the galactose transporter vSGLT reveal that the outward- and inward-facing cavities are symmetrically arranged on opposite sides of the membrane. The reciprocal opening and closing of these cavities is synchronized by the inverted repeat helices 3 and 8, providing the structural basis of the alternating access model for membrane transport.

=== Substrates ===
NCS1 proteins are H^{+}/Na^{+} symporters specific for the uptake of purines, pyrimidines and related metabolites. Krypotou et al. 2015 studied the origin, diversification and substrate specificities of fungal NCS1 transporters, suggesting that the two fungal NCS1 subfamilies, Fur and Fcy, and plant homologues, originated through independent horizontal transfers from prokaryotes. Expansion by gene duplication led to functional diversification of fungal NCS1 porters. They characterized all Fur proteins in Aspergillus nidulans. Homology modelling, substrate docking, molecular dynamics and systematic mutational analysis in three Fur transporters with distinct specificities identified residues critical for function and specificity, located within a major substrate binding site, in transmembrane segments TMS1, TMS3, TMS6 and TMS8. They predicted and confirmed that residues determining substrate specificity are located not only in the major substrate binding site, but also in a putative outward-facing selectivity gate. Their evolutionary and structure-function analyses led to the concept that selective channel-like gates may contribute to substrate specificity.

== Transport reaction ==
The generalized transport reaction catalyzed by NCS1 family permeases is:

Nucleobase or Vitamin (out) + H^{+} (out) → Nucleobase or Vitamin (in) + H^{+} (in)

== See also ==
- InterPro: IPR012681
- InterPro: IPR012732
- APC Superfamily
- Nucleobase Cation Symporter 2
