= SLC38A5 =

Protein-coding gene in the species Homo sapiens

Identifiers
- Aliases: SLC38A5, JM24, SN2, SNAT5, pp7194, solute carrier family 38 member 5
- External IDs: OMIM: 300649; MGI: 2148066; HomoloGene: 24917; GeneCards: SLC38A5; OMA:SLC38A5 - orthologs

Gene location (Human)
Chr.	X chromosome (human)
Band	Xp11.23	Start	48,458,537 bp
Band	Xp11.23	End	48,470,260 bp

Gene location (Mouse)
Chr.	X chromosome (mouse)
Band	X|X A1.1	Start	8,137,372 bp
Band	X|X A1.1	End	8,146,418 bp
RNA expression pattern
Bgee	Human / Mouse (ortholog); Top expressed in: body of pancreas; bone marrow cell; stromal cell of endometrium; upper lobe of left lung; C1 segment; mucosa of transverse colon; left lobe of thyroid gland; ganglionic eminence; right lobe of thyroid gland; right frontal lobe / Top expressed in: fetal liver hematopoietic progenitor cell; cumulus cell; tibiofemoral joint; lumbar subsegment of spinal cord; left lung lobe; blood; pyloric antrum; Ileal epithelium; perirhinal cortex; medial ganglionic eminence; More reference expression data
BioGPS	n/a
Gene ontology
Molecular function	glycine transmembrane transporter activity; amino acid transmembrane transporter activity
Cellular component	integral component of membrane; plasma membrane; integral component of plasma membrane; membrane
Biological process	amino acid transport; glycine transport; amino acid transmembrane transport
Sources:Amigo / QuickGO
Orthologs
Species	Human	Mouse
Entrez	92745	209837
Ensembl	ENSG00000017483	ENSMUSG00000031170
UniProt	Q8WUX1	Q3U1J0
RefSeq (mRNA)	NM_033518	NM_172479
RefSeq (protein)	NP_277053	NP_766067
Location (UCSC)	Chr X: 48.46 – 48.47 Mb	Chr X: 8.14 – 8.15 Mb
PubMed search
- Wikidata
View/Edit Human	View/Edit Mouse

Solute carrier family 38 member 5 is a protein that in humans is encoded by the SLC38A5 gene.

== Function ==
The protein encoded by this gene is a system N sodium-coupled amino acid transporter. The encoded protein transports glutamine, asparagine, histidine, serine, alanine, and glycine across the cell membrane, but does not transport charged amino acids, imino acids, or N-alkylated amino acids. Alternative splicing results in multiple transcript variants, but the full-length nature of some of these variants has not been determined.
