= SLC38A12 =

Human gene and protein

Identifiers
- Aliases: SLC38A12, transmembrane protein 104, TMEM104, Solute carrier family 38 member 12
- External IDs: MGI: 2444222; GeneCards: SLC38A12

Gene location (Human)
Chr.	Chromosome 17 (human)
Band	17q25.1	Start	74,776,499 bp
Band	17q25.1	End	74,839,753 bp

Gene location (Mouse)
Chr.	Chromosome 11 (mouse)
Band	11|11 E2	Start	115,078,313 bp
Band	11|11 E2	End	115,137,849 bp
RNA expression pattern
Bgee	Human / Mouse (ortholog); Top expressed in: stromal cell of endometrium; granulocyte; monocyte; parotid gland; C1 segment; left adrenal cortex; blood; right adrenal gland; right lobe of liver; gonad / Top expressed in: yolk sac; granulocyte; zygote; lumbar subsegment of spinal cord; muscle of thigh; right kidney; tail of embryo; genital tubercle; lip; secondary oocyte; More reference expression data
BioGPS	n/a
Gene ontology
Molecular function	molecular function
Cellular component	membrane; integral component of membrane; cellular component
Biological process	biological process
Sources:Amigo / QuickGO
Orthologs
Databases	NCBI: entry; OMA: entry
Species	Human	Mouse
Entrez	54868	320534
Ensembl	ENSG00000109066	ENSMUSG00000045980
UniProt	Q8NE00	Q3TB48
RefSeq (mRNA)	NM_017728; NM_001321264	NM_001033393
RefSeq (protein)	NP_001308193; NP_060198	NP_001028565
Location (UCSC)	Chr 17: 74.78 – 74.84 Mb	Chr 11: 115.08 – 115.14 Mb
PubMed search
- Wikidata
View/Edit Human	View/Edit Mouse

Solute carrier family 38 member 12 (SLC38A12) is a protein that in humans is encoded by the SLC38A12 gene (previously TMEM104). Not much has been reported about the function of this protein, but it is predicted to be located in the cell membrane.

== Gene ==
=== Location ===
TMEM104 is located on human chromosome 17 at the locus 17q25.1. TMEM104 is located between the genes NAT9 and GRIN2C.

== Transcripts ==
There are 7 main transcription variants: isoform 1, isoform 2, variant X1 - X5. TMEM104 is predicted to have a promoter region 150 base pairs upstream of the start of transcription. The promoter region of Homo sapien TMEM104 compared to other organisms is very unconserved. It was hard to find anything outside of Mammalia species and most were found under Primates.

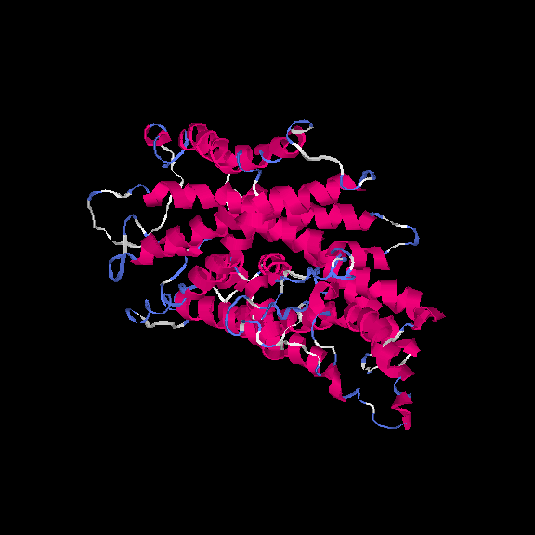
Proposed Tertiary Structure for TMEM104.

=== Tissue expression ===
In most human tissues, TMEM104 has a modest expression level (25–50th percentile), relative to all human proteins, according to RNA-seq data.

=== Subcelluar expression ===
The protein has been located primarily in the plasma membrane and less so found in nucleus.

=== Immunochemistry Data ===
Thermofisher claims that it exhibits significant nuclear and cytoplasmic positivity in glandular cells. With the aid of a TMEM104 polyclonal antibody, the samples were probed.

== Protein ==
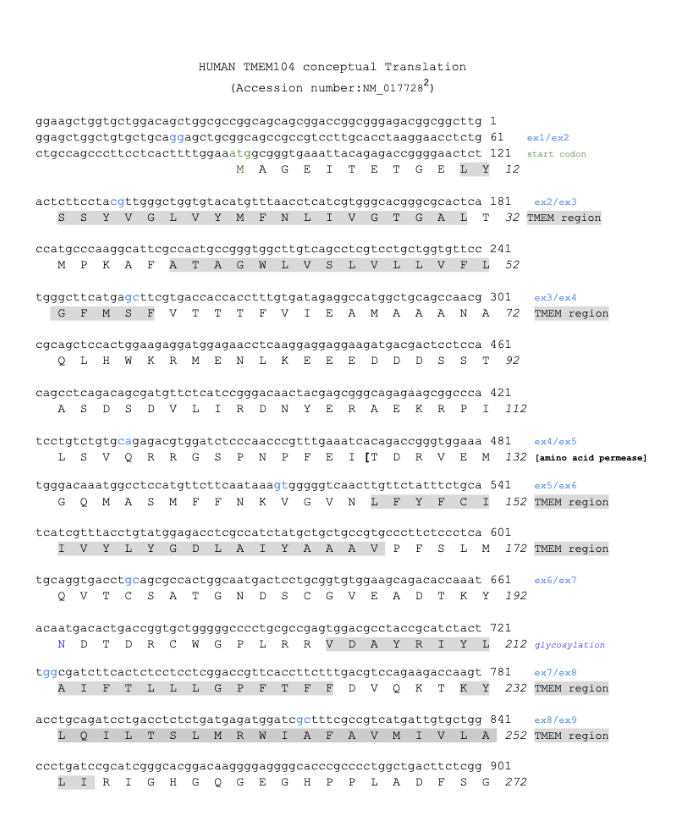
Homo sapiens TMEM104 conceptual translation

TMEM104 variant 1 protein is 496 amino acids in length. TMEM104 is a secreted protein that is overexpressed in Adrenal. TMEM104 is a phenylalanine enriched and glutamine poor protein.

=== Characteristics ===
TMEM104 has an isoelectric point of 6.8 and a molecular weight of 55.7 kdaltons. It is predicted to have between nine and eleven transmembrane domains, making it a transmembrane protein.

=== Post Translation Modifications ===
The post-translational modifications N-glycosylation, sulfonation, and phosphorylation are among those predicted for TMEM104.

=== Tertiary structure ===
TMEM104 has a tertiary structure with alpha helices and beta sheets.

=== Interaction ===
TMEM104 has been shown to interact with CASKIN2, TMEM94, TOMM6, SYNGR3, SYTL5, B3GNT8, NTRK3, C15orf39, and PPSIG.

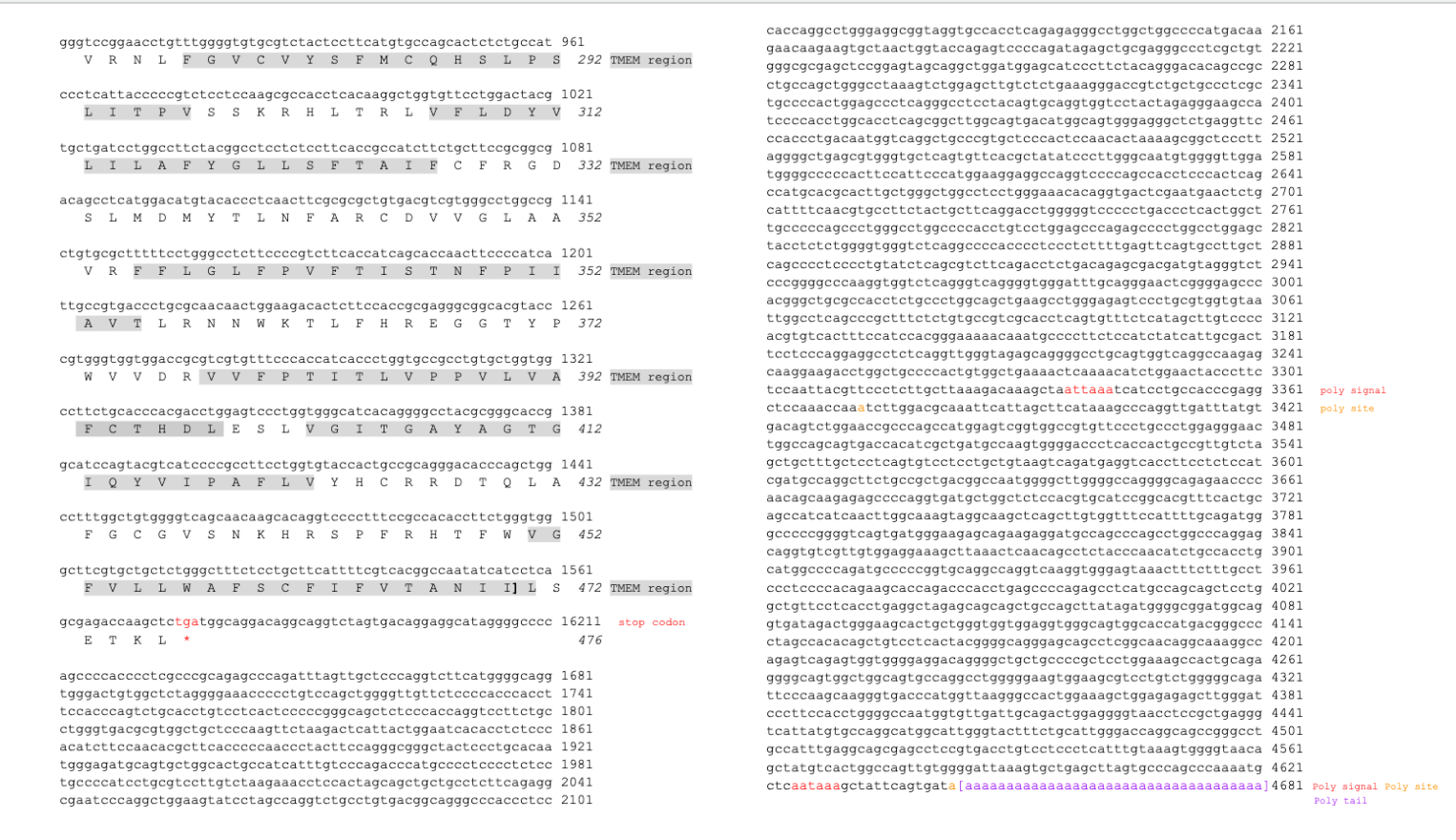
Homo sapiens TMEM104 conceptual translation

== Homology ==
=== Ortholog ===
TMEM104 has no paralogs. TMEM protein is found mostly in Eukaryotes.

The orthologs in the following table were discovered through BLAST searches. Although by no means exhaustive, this list demonstrates the enormous variety of organisms that include TMEM104 orthologs.

Seq #	TMEM104 Group	Genus, Species	Common Name	Taxonomic Group	Divergence Date (MYA)	Accession Number	Sequence Length (aa)	Sequence Identity (%)	Sequence Similarity (%)
1	MAMMALIA	Homo sapiens	Human	primates	0	NP_060198.3	496	100.00%	100.00%
2		Mus musculus	Mouse	rodentia	87	NP_001028565.1	496	89.70%	94.20%
3		Camelus ferus	Wild Bactrian Camel	tylopoda	94	XP_006179513.1	496	95.20%	98.40%
4		Bos taurus	Cattle	ruminantia	94	XP_005221277.1	496	92.80%	96.00%
5		Panthera tigris	Tiger	felidae	94	XP_007091296.2	496	92.70%	96.80%
6	AVE	Dryobates pubescens	Downy Woodpecker	aves	319	XP_009901180.1	497	82.30%	91.50%
7		Gavia stellata	Red-throated Loon	aves	319	XP_009820115.1	497	82.10%	91.10%
8		Gallus gallus	Chicken	aves	319	XP_046785426.1	498	81.90%	90.40%
9		Meleagris gallopavo	Wild Turkey	aves	319	XP_010719937.1	498	81.90%	90.00%
10		Opisthocomus hoazin	Hoatzin	aves	319	XP_009941209.1	497	81.70%	90.70%
11	REPTILIA	Trachemys scripta elegans	Turtle	reptilia	319	XP_034645854.1	497	79.90%	89.10%
12	AMPHIBIAN	Rhinatrema bivittatum	Two-lined Caecilian	amphibian	353	XP_029456459.1	510	76.20%	84.80%
13		Xenopus tropicalis	Frog	amphibian	353	NP_001016025.1	491	74.20%	84.50%
14	FISH	Megalops cyprinoides	Indo-Pacific Tarpon	actinoptergyii	431	XP_036408674.1	493	76.20%	84.40%
15		Danio rerio	Zebrafish	actinoptergyii	431	XP_693756.3	493	44.10%	60.20%
16		Carcharodon carcharias	Great White Shark	chimaeriformes	464	XP_041073221.1	499	35.30%	51.60%
17	INVERTEBRATES	Branchiostoma floridae	Lancelet	cephalochordata	556	XP_035695481.1	531	73.80%	82.50%
18		Caenorhabditis elegans	Roundworm	arthropoda	694	NP_509879.2	492	69.30%	82.60%
19		Drosophila melanogaster	Fruit Fly	arthropoda	694	NP_001262109.1	509	42.30%	63.00%
20		Anopheles gambiae	Mosquito	arthropoda	694	XP_320941.5	512	56.50%	71.40%
