= Potassium uptake permease =

Low affinity potassium transport system protein

Identifiers
- Symbol: KUP or TrkD
- Pfam: PF02705
- InterPro: IPR003855.
- TCDB: 2.A.72.1.1.
Available protein structures:
- PDB: IPR003855. PF02705 (ECOD; PDBsum)
- AlphaFold: IPR003855.; PF02705

High affinity potassium transporter

Identifiers
- Symbol: HAK1
- Pfam: PF02705
- InterPro: IPR003855
- TCDB: 2.A.72.2.1.
Available protein structures:
- PDB: IPR003855 PF02705 (ECOD; PDBsum)
- AlphaFold: IPR003855; PF02705

The potassium (K^{+}) uptake permease (KUP) family (TC# 2.A.72) is a member of the APC superfamily of secondary carriers. Proteins of the KUP/HAK/KT family include the KUP (TrkD) protein of E. coli and homologues in both Gram-positive and Gram-negative bacteria. High affinity (20 μM) K^{+} uptake systems (Hak1, TC# 2.A.72.2.1) of the yeast Debaryomyces occidentalis as well as the fungus, Neurospora crassa, and several homologues in plants have been characterized. Arabidopsis thaliana and other plants possess multiple KUP family paralogues. While many plant proteins cluster tightly together, the Hak1 proteins from yeast as well as the two Gram-positive and Gram-negative bacterial proteins are distantly related on the phylogenetic tree for the KUP family. All currently classified members of the KUP family can be found in the Transporter Classification Database.

== Structure and function ==
=== Escherichia coli ===
The E. coli protein is 622 amino acyl residues long and has 12 established transmembrane spanners (440 residues) with a requisite hydrophilic, C-terminal domain of 182 residues, localized to the cytoplasmic side of the membrane. Deletion of most of the hydrophilic domain reduces but does not abolish KUP transport activity. The function of the C-terminal domain is not known. The E. coli KUP protein is believed to be a secondary transporter. Uptake is blocked by protonophores such as CCCP (but not arsenate), and evidence for a proton symport mechanism has been presented. The N. crassa protein was earlier shown to be a K^{+}:H^{+} symporter, establishing that the KUP family consists of secondary carriers.

=== Yeast ===
The yeast high affinity (K_{M} = 1 μM) K^{+} transporter Hak1 is 762 amino acyl residues long with 12 putative TMSs. Like the E. coli KUP protein, it possesses a C-terminal hydrophilic domain, probably localized to the cytoplasmic side of the membrane. Hak1 may be able to accumulate K^{+} 10^{6}-fold against a concentration gradient. The plant high and low affinity K^{+} transporters can complement K^{+} uptake defects in E. coli.

=== TRK ===
TRK transporters, responsible for the bulk of K^{+} accumulation in plants, fungi, and bacteria, mediate ion currents driven by the large membrane voltages (-150 to -250 mV) common to non-animal cells. Bacterial TRK proteins resemble K^{+} channels in their primary sequence, crystallize as membrane dimers having intramolecular K^{+}-channel-like folding, and complex with a cytoplasmic collar formed of four RCK domains. Fungal TRK proteins possess a large built-in regulatory domain and a highly conserved pair of transmembrane helices (TMSs 7 and 8, ahead of the C-terminus), postulated to facilitate intramembranal oligomerization. These fungal HAK proteins are chloride channels mediating efflux, a process suppressed by osmoprotective agents. It involve hydrophobic gating and resembles conduction by Cys-loop ligand-gated anion channels. Possibly, the tendency of hydrophobic or amphipathic transmembrane helices to self-organize into oligomers creates novel ionic pathways through membranes: hydrophobic nanopores, pathways of low selectivity governed by the chaotropic behavior of individual ionic species under the influence of membrane voltage.

== Transport reaction ==
The generalized transport reaction for members of the KUP family is:

K^{+} (out) + energy → K^{+} (in).

== See also ==
- Transporter Classification Database
- Membrane transport protein
