= APC superfamily =

Identifiers
- Symbol: APC
- Pfam clan: CL0062
- ECOD: 5051.1.1
- TCDB: 2.A.3
- OPM superfamily: 64

The amino acid-polyamine-organocation (APC) superfamily is the second largest superfamily of secondary carrier proteins currently known, and it contains several Solute carriers. Originally, the APC superfamily consisted of subfamilies under the transporter classification number (TC # 2.A.3). This superfamily has since been expanded to include eighteen different families.

The most recent families added include the PAAP (Putative Amino Acid Permease), LIVCS (Branched Chain Amino Acid:Cation Symporter), NRAMP (Natural Resistance-Associated Macrophage Protein), CstA (Carbon starvation A protein), KUP (K^{+} Uptake Permease), BenE (Benzoate:H^{+} Virginia Symporter), and AE (Anion Exchanger). Bioinformatic and phylogenetic analysis is used to continually expand currently existing families and superfamilies.

Other constituents of the APC superfamily are the AAAP family (TC# 2.A.18), the HAAAP family (TC# 2.A.42) and the LCT family (TC# 2.A.43). Some of these proteins exhibit 11 TMSs. Eukaryotic members of this superfamily have been reviewed by Wipf et al. (2002) and Fischer et al. (1998).

== Families ==
Currently recognized families within the APC Superfamily (with TC numbers in blue) include:

- 2.A.3 - The Amino Acid-Polyamine-Organocation (APC) Family
- 2.A.15 - The Betaine/Carnitine/Choline Transporter (BCCT) Family
- 2.A.18 - The Amino Acid/Auxin Permease (AAAP) Family
- 2.A.21 - The Solute:Sodium Symporter (SSS) Family
- 2.A.22 - The Neurotransmitter:Sodium Symporter (NSS) Family
- 2.A.25 - The Alanine or Glycine:Cation Symporter (AGCS) Family
- 2.A.26 - The Branched Chain Amino Acid:Cation Symporter (LIVCS) Family
- 2.A.30 - The Cation-Chloride Cotransporter (CCC) Family
- 2.A.31 - The Anion Exchanger (AE) Family
- 2.A.39 - The Nucleobase:Cation Symporter-1 (NCS1) Family
- 2.A.40 - The Nucleobase/Ascorbate Transporter (NAT) or Nucleobase:Cation Symporter-2 (NCS2) Family
- 2.A.42 - The Hydroxy/Aromatic Amino Acid Permease (HAAAP) Family
- 2.A.46 - The Benzoate:H^{+} Symporter (BenE) Family
- 2.A.53 - The Sulfate Permease (SulP) Family
- 2.A.55 - The Metal Ion (Mn^{2+}-iron) Transporter (Nramp) Family
- 2.A.72 - The K^{+} Uptake Permease (KUP) Family
- 2.A.114 - The Putative Peptide Transporter Carbon Starvation CstA (CstA) Family
- 2.A.120 - The Putative Amino Acid Permease (PAAP) Family

== APC proteins in humans ==
There are several APC proteins expressed in humans, and they are SLC proteins. There are 11 SLC families including APC proteins: SLC4, 5, 6, 7, 11, 12, 23, 26, 32, 36, and 38. The atypical SLC TMEM104 is also clustered to the APC clan.

== Structure and function ==
The topology of the well-characterized human Anion Exchanger 1 (AE1) conforms to a UraA-like topology of 14 TMSs (12 α-helical TMSs and 2 mixed coil/helical TMSs). All functionally characterized members of the APC superfamily use cation symport for substrate accumulation except for some members of the AE family which frequently use anion:anion exchange. All new entries contain the two 5 or 7 TMS repeat units characteristic of the APC superfamily, sometimes with extra TMSs at the ends likely the result of an addition prior to duplication. The CstA family contains the greatest variation in TMSs. New functionally characterized members transport amino acids, peptides, and inorganic anions or cations. Except for anions, these are typical substrates of established APC superfamily members. Active site TMSs are rich in glycyl residues in variable but conserved arrangements.

In CadB of E. coli (2.A.3.2.2), amino acid residues involved in both uptake and excretion, or solely in excretion are located in the cytoplasmic loops and the cytoplasmic side of transmembrane segments, whereas residues involved in uptake are located in the periplasmic loops and the transmembrane segments. A hydrophilic cavity is proposed to be formed by the transmembrane segments II, III, IV, VI, VII, X, XI, and XII. Based on 3-D structures of APC superfamily members, Rudnick (2011) has proposed the pathway for transport and suggested a "rocking bundle" mechanism.

The structure and function of the cadaverine-lysine antiporter, CadB (2.A.3.2.2), and the putrescine-ornithine antiporter, PotE (2.A.3.2.1), in E. coli have been evaluated using model structures based on the crystal structure of AdiC (2.A.3.2.5), an agmatine-arginine antiporter (PDB: 3L1L). The central cavity of CadB, containing the substrate-binding site is wider than that of PotE, mirroring the different sizes of cadaverine and putrescine. The size of the central cavity of CadB and PotE is dependent on the angle of transmembrane helix 6 (TM6) against the periplasm. Tyr(73), Tyr(89), Tyr(90), Glu(204), Tyr(235), Asp(303), and Tyr(423) of CadB, and Cys(62), Trp(201), Glu(207), Trp(292), and Tyr(425) of PotE are strongly involved in the antiport activities. In addition, Trp(43), Tyr(57), Tyr(107), Tyr(366), and Tyr(368) of CadB are involved preferentially in cadaverine uptake at neutral pH, while only Tyr(90) of PotE is involved preferentially in putrescine uptake. The results indicated that the central cavity of CadB consists of TMs 2, 3, 6, 7, 8, and 10, and that of PotE consists of TMs 2, 3, 6, and 8. Several residues are necessary for recognition of cadaverine in the periplasm because the level of cadaverine is much lower than that of putrescine at neutral pH.

The roughly barrel-shaped AdiC subunit of approx. 45 Å diameter consists of 12 transmembrane helices, TMS1 and TMS6 being interrupted by short non-helical stretches in the middle of their transmembrane spans. Biochemical analysis of homologues places the amino and carboxy termini on the intracellular side of the membrane. TM1–TM10 surround a large cavity exposed to the extracellular solution. These ten helices comprise two inverted structural repeats. TM1–TM5 of AdiC align well with TM6–TM10 turned 'upside down' around a pseudo-two-fold axis nearly parallel to the membrane plane. Thus, TMS1 pairs with TMS6, TMS2 with TMS7, etc. Helices TMS11 and TMS12, non-participants in this repeat, provide most of the 2,500 Å 2 homodimeric interface. AdiC mirrors the common fold observed unexpectedly in four phylogenetically unrelated families of Na^{+}-coupled solute transporters: BCCT (2.A.15), NCS1 (2.A.39), SSS (2.A.21) and NSS (2.A.22).

=== Transport reactions ===
Transport reactions generally catalyzed by APC superfamily members include:

==== Solute:proton symport ====
Solute (out) + nH^{+} (out) → Solute (in) + nH^{+} (in).

==== Solute:solute antiport ====
Solute-1 (out) + Solute-2 (in) ⇌ Solute-1 (in) + Solute-2 (out).

These reactions may differ for some family members.
