= HAAAP family =

The Hydroxy/Aromatic Amino Acid Permease (HAAAP) Family (TC# 2.A.42) is a member of the large Amino Acid-Polyamine-OrganoCation (APC) Superfamily of secondary carrier proteins. Members of the HAAAP family all function in amino acid uptake. Homologues are present in many Gram-negative and Gram-positive bacteria, with at least one member classified from archaea (TC# 2.A.42.1.7, Thermococcus barophilus).

== Structure ==
Proteins of the HAAAP family possess 403-443 amino acyl residues and exhibit eleven putative or established TransMembrane α-helical Spanners (TMSs). These proteins exhibit topological features common to the eukaryotic amino acid/auxin permease (AAAP) family (TC# 2.A.18). These proteins also exhibit limited sequence similarity with some of the AAAP family members. A phylogenetic relationship has been proposed between members of the HAP family and the APC family since they exhibit limited sequence similarity with one another.

As of early 2016, no crystal structural data is available for members of the HAAAP family in RCSB.

== Members ==
The HAAAP family includes three well-characterized aromatic amino acid/H^{+} symport permeases of E. coli and two hydroxy amino acid permeases. The aromatic amino acid/H^{+} symport permeases are:

- Mtr, a high affinity tryptophan-specific permease (TC# 2.A.42.1.2).
- TnaB, a low affinity tryptophan permease (TC# 2.A.42.1.3).
- TyrP, a tyrosine-specific permease (TC# 2.A.42.1.1).

The two hydroxy amino acid permeases are:

- SdaC, the serine permease (TC# 2.A.42.2.1), of E. coli. SdaC of E. coli (TC# 2.A.42.2.1) is also called DcrA, and together with a periplasmic protein DcrB (P37620), has been reported to play a role in phage DNA uptake in conjunction with an outer membrane receptors of the OMR family (TC# 1.B.14).
- TdcC, the threonine permease (TC# 2.A.42.2.2), of E. coli.

Thus, FhuA (TC# 1.B.14.1.4) transports phage T5 DNA while BtuB (TC# 1.B.14.3.1) transports phage C1 DNA (Samsonov et al., 2002). DcuB is a putative lipoprotein found only in enteric bacteria.

All members of the HAAAP family can be found in the Transporter Classification Database.

== Transport Reaction ==
The generalized transport reaction catalyzed by proteins of the HAAAP family is:

Amino acid (out) + nH^{+} (out) → Amino acid (in) + nH^{+} (in).
