= 6TMS neutral amino acid transporter family =

Family of transporters

The 6TMS Neutral Amino Acid Transporter (NAAT) Family (TC# 2.A.95) is a family of transporters belonging to the Lysine Exporter (LysE) Superfamily. Homologues are found in numerous Gram-negative and Gram-positive bacteria including many human pathogens. Several archaea also encode MarC (see below) homologues. Some of these organisms have 2 or more paralogues. Most of these proteins are of about the same size (180-230 aas) although a few are larger. They exhibit 6 (or in some cases, possibly 5) putative TMSs. A representative list of members belonging to the NAAT family can be found in the Transporter Classification Database.

== SnatA ==
A gene encoding a small neutral amino acid transporter was cloned from the genome of the hyperthermophilic archaeon Thermococcus sp. KS-1. The cloned gene, snatA, encodes a protein of 216 amino acid residues, SnatA (TC# 2.A.95.1.4), with six membrane-spanning segments (TMSs). Competition studies indicated that SnatA transports various L-type neutral amino acids. It has also been noted that glycine transport is inhibited by a protonophore, FCCP, or valinomycin plus nigericin, indicating that the process is dependent on an electrochemical potential of H^{+}.

The generalized reaction catalyzed by SnatA is:

Amino acid (in) → Amino acid (out)

== MarC ==
MarC is encoded by a gene at the multiple antibiotic resistance (mar) locus. The mar locus consists of two divergently positioned transcriptional units that flank the operator, marO, in both E. coli and Salmonella typhimurium. One transcription unit encodes MarC, an integral inner membrane protein with 6 established TMSs with the N- and C-termini in the cytoplasm. Its function is unknown. The other unit consists of an operon, marRAB, encoding (1) the MarR repressor which binds marO and negatively regulates marRAB expression, (2) MarA, a transcriptional activator that activates expression of other genes such as acrAB (encoding the principal E. coli multidrug efflux pump of the RND superfamily (TC #2.A.6.2)) and the mar regulon itself, and (3) MarB, a small protein of 71 amino acyl residues of unknown function. A periplasmic binding protein, MppA, essential for the uptake of the cell wall murein tripeptide, L-alanyl-γ-D-glutamyl-meso-diaminopimelate via the Opp permease, regulates mar regulon expression. Loss of MppA causes overproduction of MarA which activates acrAB, causing pleiotropic drug resistance. MppA probably functions upstream of MarA in a signal transduction pathway that negatively controls expression of the marRAB operon.
