= SLC5A4 =

Protein-coding gene in the species Homo sapiens

Identifiers
- Aliases: SLC5A4, DJ90G24.4, SAAT1, SGLT3, solute carrier family 5 member 4
- External IDs: MGI: 1927848; GeneCards: SLC5A4

Gene location (Human)
| Chr. | Chromosome 22 (human) |
| Band | 22q12.3 | Start | 32,218,464 bp |
| Band | 22q12.3 | End | 32,255,347 bp |

Gene location (Mouse)
| Chr. | Chromosome 10 (mouse) |
| Band | 10|10 C1 | Start | 75,983,285 bp |
| Band | 10|10 C1 | End | 76,025,099 bp |
RNA expression pattern
| Bgee | Human / Mouse (ortholog); Top expressed in: duodenum; testicle; islet of Langerhans; smooth muscle tissue; upper lobe of left lung; body of uterus; sural nerve; right lung; left lobe of thyroid gland; right lobe of thyroid gland / Top expressed in: morula; jejunum; intestinal villus; duodenum; lumbar subsegment of spinal cord; proximal tubule; cumulus cell; ileum; right kidney; ovary; More reference expression data |
| BioGPS | n/a |
Gene ontology
| Molecular function | glucose:sodium symporter activity; transmembrane transporter activity |
| Cellular component | integral component of membrane; membrane; integral component of plasma membrane; plasma membrane |
| Biological process | ion transport; transmembrane transport; sodium ion transport; glucose transmembrane transport |
Sources:Amigo / QuickGO
Orthologs
| Databases | NCBI: entry; OMA: entry |
| Species | Human | Mouse |
| Entrez | 6527 | 64452 |
| Ensembl | ENSG00000100191 | ENSMUSG00000020229 |
| UniProt | Q9NY91 | Q9ET37 |
| RefSeq (mRNA) | NM_014227 | NM_133184 |
| RefSeq (protein) | NP_055042 | NP_573447 |
| Location (UCSC) | Chr 22: 32.22 – 32.26 Mb | Chr 10: 75.98 – 76.03 Mb |
| PubMed search |
- Wikidata
| View/Edit Human | View/Edit Mouse |

The low affinity sodium-glucose cotransporter also known as the sodium/glucose cotransporter 3 (SGLT3) or solute carrier family 5 member 4 (SLC5A4) is a protein that in humans is encoded by the SLC5A4 gene. It functions as a sugar sensor.
