= Benzoate:H symporter =

Family of transport proteins

The benzoate:H symporter (BenE) family (TC# 2.A.46) is a member of the APC Superfamily. The BenE family contains only two functionally characterized and sequenced members, the benzoate permeases of Acinetobacter calcoaceticus and E. coli. These proteins are about 400 residues in length and probably span the membrane 12 times. Some members of the BenE family can have as little as 7 TMSs (i.e., BenE of Frankia sp. Ccl3; TC# 2.A.46.1.6), or as many as 14 TMSs (i.e., BenE of Cellvibrio gilvus; TC# 2.A.46.1.4). BenE family members exhibit about 30% identity to each other and limited sequence similarity to members of the Aromatic Acid:H Symporter (AAHS) family (TC# 2.A.1.15) of the Major Facilitator Superfamily (MFS). The degree of similarity with the latter proteins is insufficient to establish homology. As of early 2016, no crystal structural data is available for members of the BenE family.

== Transport reaction ==
The generalized transport reaction catalyzed by BenE of A. calcoaceticus is:

Benzoate (out) + H^{+} (out) → Benzoate (in) + H^{+} (in).
