= Chloride anion exchanger =

Protein found in humans

SLC26A3

Identifiers
- Aliases: SLC26A3, CLD, DRA, solute carrier family 26 member 3
- External IDs: OMIM: 126650; MGI: 107181; GeneCards: SLC26A3

Gene location (Human)
Chr.	Chromosome 7 (human)
Band	7q22.3-q31.1	Start	107,765,467 bp
Band	7q22.3-q31.1	End	107,803,225 bp

Gene location (Mouse)
Chr.	Chromosome 12 (mouse)
Band	12 A2|12 13.45 cM	Start	31,440,870 bp
Band	12 A2|12 13.45 cM	End	31,523,916 bp
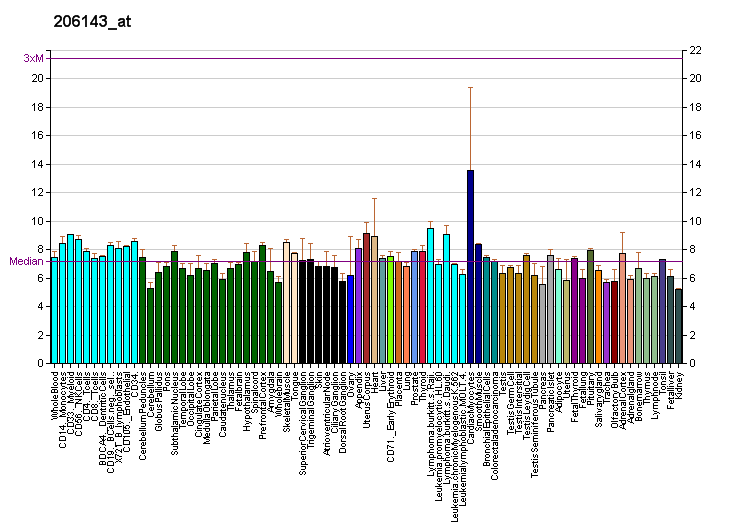
RNA expression pattern
Bgee	Human / Mouse (ortholog); Top expressed in: mucosa of colon; mucosa of sigmoid colon; rectum; mucosa of transverse colon; seminal vesicula; mucosa of ileum; jejunal mucosa; duodenum; appendix; corpus epididymis / Top expressed in: left colon; epithelium of small intestine; duodenum; seminal vesicula; ileum; jejunum; Paneth cell; efferent ductule; migratory enteric neural crest cell; cecum; More reference expression data
BioGPS	More reference expression data
Gene ontology
Molecular function	chloride transmembrane transporter activity; transporter activity; DNA-binding transcription factor activity; transcription coregulator activity; sulfate transmembrane transporter activity; secondary active sulfate transmembrane transporter activity; bicarbonate transmembrane transporter activity; oxalate transmembrane transporter activity; protein binding; antiporter activity; chloride channel activity; inorganic anion exchanger activity
Cellular component	integral component of membrane; membrane; plasma membrane; integral component of plasma membrane; brush border membrane; apical plasma membrane; sperm midpiece
Biological process	excretion; intracellular pH elevation; membrane hyperpolarization; sulfate transport; regulation of membrane potential; regulation of intracellular pH; ion transport; anion transport; bicarbonate transport; sperm capacitation; chloride transport; cellular response to cAMP; regulation of transcription, DNA-templated; chloride transmembrane transport; oxalate transport; sulfate transmembrane transport; transmembrane transport; regulation of nucleic acid-templated transcription; anion transmembrane transport
Sources:Amigo / QuickGO
Orthologs
Databases	NCBI: entry; OMA: entry
Species	Human	Mouse
Entrez	1811	13487
Ensembl	ENSG00000091138	ENSMUSG00000001225
UniProt	P40879	Q9WVC8
RefSeq (mRNA)	NM_000111	NM_021353
RefSeq (protein)	NP_000102	NP_067328
Location (UCSC)	Chr 7: 107.77 – 107.8 Mb	Chr 12: 31.44 – 31.52 Mb
PubMed search
- Wikidata
View/Edit Human	View/Edit Mouse

Chloride anion exchanger, also known as down-regulated in adenoma (protein DRA), is a protein that in humans is encoded by the SLC26A3 gene.

== Function ==
Protein DRA is a membrane protein in intestinal cells. It is an anion exchanger and a member of the sulfate anion transporter (SAT) family. It mediates chloride and bicarbonate exchange and additionally transports sulfate and other anions at the apical membrane, part of the plasma membrane of enterocytes. It is different from the anion exchanger that present in erythrocytes, renal tubule, and several other tissues.

The protein encoded by this gene is a transmembrane glycoprotein that functions as a sulfate transporter. It is localized to the mucosa of the lower intestinal tract, particularly to the apical membrane of columnar epithelium and some goblet cells, and is instrumental in chloride reuptake, aiding in the creation of an osmotic gradient for resorption of fluid from the lumen of the intestine.

== Clinical significance ==
Mutations in this gene have been associated with congenital chloride diarrhoea, a treatable disease.

The congenital absence of this membrane protein results in an autosomal recessive disorder called congenital chloridorrhea or congenital chloride diarrhea (CLD).

== See also ==
- Solute carrier family
