= Cystatin-A =

Protein-coding gene in the species Homo sapiens

CSTA
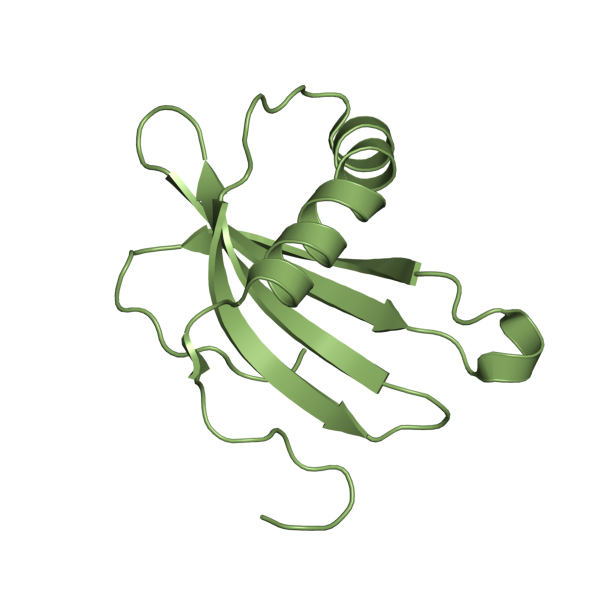

Identifiers
- Aliases: CSTA, AREI, STF1, STFA, Cystatin A, PSS4
- External IDs: OMIM: 184600; MGI: 1924020; GeneCards: CSTA
Available structures
PDB	Ortholog search: PDBe RCSB
PDB	List of PDB id codes 1CYU, 1CYV, 1DVC, 1DVD, 1GD3, 1GD4, 1N9J, 1NB3, 1NB5, 3K9M, 3KFQ, 3KSE

Gene location (Human)
Chr.	Chromosome 3 (human)
Band	3q21.1	Start	122,325,248 bp
Band	3q21.1	End	122,341,969 bp

Gene location (Mouse)
Chr.	Chromosome 16 (mouse)
Band	16|16 B3	Start	36,041,838 bp
Band	16|16 B3	End	36,077,810 bp
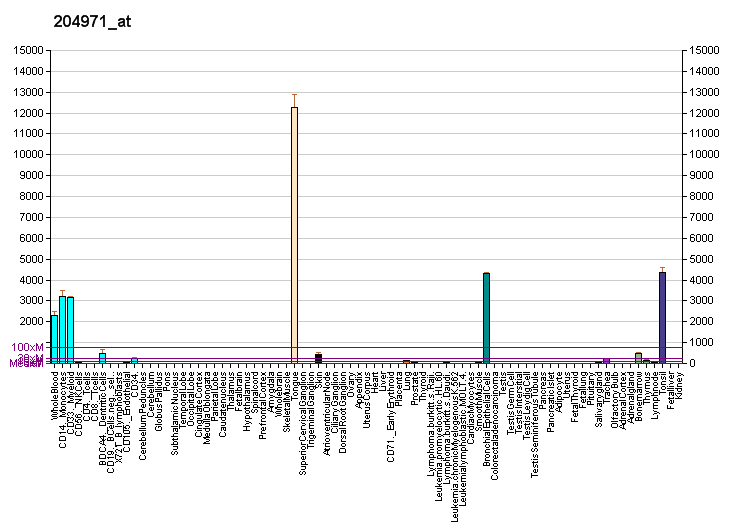
RNA expression pattern
Bgee	Human / Mouse (ortholog); Top expressed in: mucosa of pharynx; oral cavity; gums; gingival epithelium; body of tongue; human penis; vulva; superior surface of tongue; epithelium of nasopharynx; skin of thigh / Top expressed in: granulocyte; zygote; morula; blastocyst; blood; right kidney; proximal tubule; suprachiasmatic nucleus; secondary oocyte; primary oocyte; More reference expression data
BioGPS	More reference expression data
Gene ontology
Molecular function	peptidase inhibitor activity; protease binding; protein-macromolecule adaptor activity; endopeptidase inhibitor activity; structural molecule activity; cysteine-type endopeptidase inhibitor activity
Cellular component	cytoplasm; intracellular anatomical structure; cornified envelope; extracellular space; nucleus; cytosol
Biological process	negative regulation of proteolysis; peptide cross-linking; negative regulation of peptidase activity; cell adhesion; keratinocyte differentiation; negative regulation of endopeptidase activity; cornification; cell-cell adhesion
Sources:Amigo / QuickGO
Orthologs
Databases	NCBI: entry; OMA: entry
Species	Human	Mouse
Entrez	1475	76770
Ensembl	ENSG00000121552	ENSMUSG00000095620
UniProt	P01040	Q9D8D6
RefSeq (mRNA)	NM_005213	NM_029733; NM_001384090
RefSeq (protein)	NP_005204	NP_084009; NP_001371019
Location (UCSC)	Chr 3: 122.33 – 122.34 Mb	Chr 16: 36.04 – 36.08 Mb
PubMed search
- Wikidata
View/Edit Human	View/Edit Mouse

Cystatin-A is a protein that in humans is encoded by the CSTA gene.

The cystatin superfamily encompasses proteins that contain multiple cystatin-like sequences. Some of the members are active cysteine protease inhibitors, while others have lost or perhaps never acquired this inhibitory activity. There are three inhibitory families in the superfamily, including the type 1 cystatins (stefins), type 2 cystatins, and kininogens. This gene encodes a stefin that functions as a cysteine protease inhibitor, forming tight complexes with papain and the cathepsins B, H, and L. The protein is one of the precursor proteins of cornified cell envelope in keratinocytes and plays a role in epidermal development and maintenance. Stefins have been proposed as prognostic and diagnostic tools for cancer.

== Structure and inhibatory mechanism ==
The structure of cystatin A features a wedge-like shape that's typical of cysteine protease inhibitors. This shape is critical for how it blocks protease activity. The protein has three main functional regions:

- An N-terminal region with a conserved glycine
- Two β-hairpin loops (the first loop contains the important QVVAG sequence shown in blue in the image)
- A C-terminal region that helps stabilize the structure

These three regions work together to form the functional core that fits into the catalytic cleft of target proteases. The inhibitory mechanism depends on specific structural features:

- Leu73 in the second binding loop plays a crucial role in the inhibitory activity
- The N-terminal domain contributes about 40% of the overall binding energy
- Pro-3 and Ile-2 are particularly important for energy binding

== Function ==
Cystatin A mainly works as an inhibitor of cysteine proteases, with strong binding to papain and cathepsins B, H, and L. It also serves as a building block for the cornified cell envelope in skin cells and helps with skin growth and maintenance.

In tissues, cystatin A helps regulate protein breakdown by controlling the activity of these proteases. This regulation is important for normal cell function and can be disrupted in certain diseases.

== Interactions ==
Cystatin A has been shown to interact with Cathepsin B and CTSL1.

== Clinical significance ==
Altered levels of cystatin A have been observed in several disease states, particularly in skin disorders and certain cancers. Its role as a protease inhibitor makes it potentially valuable as both a diagnostic marker and therapeutic target.

== See also ==
- Peptide Transporter Carbon Starvation (cstA) Family
