= Peptide transporter carbon starvation family =

The Peptide Transporter Carbon Starvation (CstA) Family (TC# 2.A.114) is a member of the APC superfamily and consists of proteins from bacteria and archaea. These proteins are of various sizes and topologies. For example, CstA of E. coli has 701 aas with 18 putative TMSs. It has a long N-terminal CstA domain and a short C-terminal DUF4161 domain. This protein is encoded by a carbon starvation inducible gene, cstA, that is under cyclic AMP-CRP control. Circumstantial evidence suggested that it may be a peptide transporter. A Campylobacter jejuni homologue has been shown to transport di- and tripeptides (see TC# 2.A.114.1.5). Proteins currently known to belong to the CstA family are listed in the Transporter Classification Database. As of early 2016, there is no crystal structural data available for members of the CstA family on RCSB.

== See also ==
- Cystatin A
