= Council of Science and Technology Advisors =

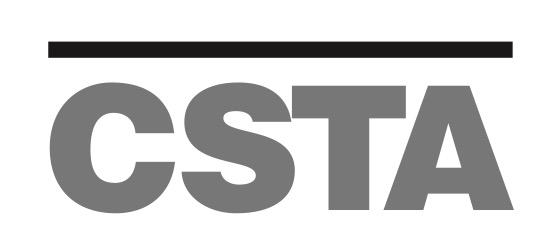
- Formation: 1998
- Dissolved: 2007
- Purpose: Support Canadian S&T Strategy

The Council of Science and Technology Advisors (CSTA) was a Canadian institution active between 1998 and 2007. It was created to support the goals expressed in Science and Technology for the New Century – A Federal Strategy, issued by the Government of Canada in March 1996. Its primary task was to provide strategic advice to the Cabinet Committee for the Economic Union on the management of the federal science and technology enterprise.

In 2006, CSTA consisted of 22 representatives from academia, industry and not-for-profit organizations. They were appointed by the Ministers of federal science-based departments and agencies. The CSTA was abandoned in 2007 alongside the Advisory Council on Science and Technology (ACST), the Canadian Biotechnology Advisory Committee (CBAC), and the Office of the National Science Advisor (NSA).

== Reports ==
The CSTA issued the following reports:

=== 1999 ===
- Science Advice for Government Effectiveness (SAGE)
- Building Excellence in Science and Technology (BEST): The Federal Roles in Performing Science and Technology

=== 2001 ===
- Reinforcing External Advice To Departments (READ)
- Science and Technology Excellence in the Public Service (STEPS): a Framework for Excellence in Federally Performed Science and Technology

=== 2002 ===
- Employees Driving Government Excellence (EDGE): Renewing S&T Human Resources in the Federal Public Service

=== 2003 ===
- Science Communications and Opportunities for Public Engagement (SCOPE)

=== 2005 ===
- Linkages in the National Knowledge System (LINKS): Fostering a Linked Federal S&T Enterprise
