= APC Family =

Group of transport proteins

Identifiers
- Symbol: APC
- Pfam: PF00324
- InterPro: IPR004841
- TCDB: 2.A.3
- OPM superfamily: 64
- OPM protein: 3gia
Available protein structures:
- PDB: IPR004841 PF00324 (ECOD; PDBsum)
- AlphaFold: IPR004841; PF00324

The Amino Acid-Polyamine-Organocation (APC) Family (TC# 2.A.3) of transport proteins includes members that function as solute:cation symporters and solute:solute antiporters. They occur in bacteria, archaea, fungi, unicellular eukaryotic protists, slime molds, plants and animals. They vary in length, being as small as 350 residues and as large as 850 residues. The smaller proteins are generally of prokaryotic origin while the larger ones are of eukaryotic origin. Most of them possess twelve transmembrane α-helical spanners but have a re-entrant loop involving TMSs 2 and 3. The APC Superfamily was established to encompass a wider range of homologues.

== Members of APC Family ==
Members of one subfamily within the APC family (SGP; TC# 2.A.3.9) are amino acid receptors rather than transporters and are truncated at their C-termini, relative to the transporters, having 10 TMSs.

The eukaryotic members of another subfamily (CAT; TC# 2.A.3.3) and the members of a prokaryotic subfamily (AGT; TC #2.A.3.11) have 14 TMSs.

The larger eukaryotic and archaeal proteins possess N- and C-terminal hydrophilic extensions. Some animal proteins, for example, those in the LAT subfamily (TC# 2.A.3.8) including ASUR4 (gbY12716) and SPRM1 (gbL25068) associate with a type 1 transmembrane glycoprotein that is essential for insertion or activity of the permease and forms a disulfide bridge with it. These glycoproteins include the CD98 heavy chain protein of Mus musculus (gbU25708) and the orthologous 4F2 cell surface antigen heavy chain of Homo sapiens (spP08195). The latter protein is required for the activity of the cystine/glutamate antiporter (2.A.3.8.5), which maintains cellular redox balance and cysteine/glutathione levels. They are members of the rBAT family of mammalian proteins (TC #8.A.9).

Most S. cerevisiae amino acid permeases are members of the APC family. The majority of these permeases belong to the YAT sub-family (2.A.3.10) and they have a broad range of overlapping specificities. Two additional permeases belong to the LAT sub-family (2.A.3.8.4 and 2.A.3.8.16) and support methionine and cysteine intake. The final one identified is an ACT sub-family (2.A.3.4.3) member, a GABA permease, present in both cell and vacuolar membranes; all others are found only in the cell membrane.

Two APC family members, LAT1 and LAT2 (TC #2.A.3.8.7), transport a neurotoxicant, the methylmercury-L-cysteine complex, by molecular mimicry.

Hip1 of S. cerevisiae (TC #2.A.3.1.5) has been implicated in heavy metal transport.

=== Subfamilies ===
Subfamilies of the APC family, and the proteins in these families, can be found in the Transporter Classification Database:

- 2.A.3.1: The Amino Acid Transporter (AAT) Family
- 2.A.3.2: The Basic Amino Acid/Polyamine Antiporter (APA) Family
- 2.A.3.3: The Cationic Amino Acid Transporter (CAT) Family
- 2.A.3.4: The Amino Acid/Choline Transporter (ACT) Family
- 2.A.3.5: The Ethanolamine Transporter (EAT) Family
- 2.A.3.6: The Archaeal/Bacterial Transporter (ABT) Family
- 2.A.3.7: The Glutamate:GABA Antiporter (GGA) Family
- 2.A.3.8: The L-type Amino Acid Transporter (LAT) Family (Many LAT family members function as heterooligomers with rBAT and/or 4F2hc (TC #8.A.9))
- 2.A.3.9: The Spore Germination Protein (SGP) Family
- 2.A.3.10: The Yeast Amino Acid Transporter (YAT) Family
- 2.A.3.11: The Aspartate/Glutamate Transporter (AGT) Family
- 2.A.3.12: The Polyamine:H+ Symporter (PHS) Family
- 2.A.3.13: The Amino Acid Efflux (AAE) Family
- 2.A.3.14: The Unknown APC-1 (U-APC1) Family
- 2.A.3.15: The Unknown APC-2 (U-APC2) Family

== Structure and function ==
Based on 3-D structures of APC superfamily members, Rudnick (2011) has proposed the pathway for transport and suggested a "rocking bundle" mechanism.

=== Transport reactions ===
Transport reactions generally catalyzed by APC Superfamily members include:

Solute:proton symport

Solute (out) + nH+ (out) → Solute (in) + nH+  (in).

Solute:solute antiport

Solute-1 (out) + Solute-2 (in) ⇌ Solute-1 (in) + Solute-2 (out).

== See also ==
- APC Superfamily
- Transporter Classification Database
- Membrane transport protein
