= SLC26A6 =

Protein-coding gene in the species Homo sapiens

Identifiers
- Aliases: SLC26A6, solute carrier family 26 member 6
- External IDs: OMIM: 610068; MGI: 2159728; GeneCards: SLC26A6

Gene location (Human)
Chr.	Chromosome 3 (human)
Band	3p21.31	Start	48,625,723 bp
Band	3p21.31	End	48,635,493 bp

Gene location (Mouse)
Chr.	Chromosome 9 (mouse)
Band	9|9 F2	Start	108,730,482 bp
Band	9|9 F2	End	108,742,117 bp
RNA expression pattern
Bgee	Human / Mouse (ortholog); Top expressed in: mucosa of transverse colon; Descending thoracic aorta; popliteal artery; tibial arteries; ascending aorta; oocyte; rectum; stromal cell of endometrium; left coronary artery; body of stomach / Top expressed in: duodenum; jejunum; ileum; primary oocyte; yolk sac; pancreas; muscle tissue; skeletal muscle tissue; quadriceps femoris muscle; secondary oocyte; More reference expression data
BioGPS	n/a
Gene ontology
Molecular function	PDZ domain binding; formate transmembrane transporter activity; chloride transmembrane transporter activity; anion transmembrane transporter activity; sulfate transmembrane transporter activity; secondary active sulfate transmembrane transporter activity; bicarbonate transmembrane transporter activity; formate efflux transmembrane transporter activity; oxalate transmembrane transporter activity; protein binding; efflux transmembrane transporter activity; antiporter activity; chloride channel activity; inorganic anion exchanger activity
Cellular component	integral component of membrane; membrane; intracellular membrane-bounded organelle; vesicle membrane; plasma membrane; integral component of plasma membrane; chloride channel complex; brush border membrane; basolateral plasma membrane; apical plasma membrane; endoplasmic reticulum; sperm midpiece; cytoplasmic vesicle membrane; cytoplasmic vesicle; intracellular anatomical structure; vesicle
Biological process	oxalic acid secretion; mannitol transport; oxalate transport; formate transport; intracellular pH elevation; sulfate transport; epithelial fluid transport; angiotensin-activated signaling pathway; regulation of membrane potential; regulation of intracellular pH; cellular response to fructose stimulus; ion transport; transepithelial chloride transport; protein kinase C signaling; anion transport; transepithelial transport; cellular response to interferon-gamma; sperm capacitation; intestinal absorption; chloride transport; positive regulation of dipeptide transmembrane transport; cellular response to cAMP; anion transmembrane transport; sulfate transmembrane transport; bicarbonate transport; transmembrane transport; chloride transmembrane transport
Sources:Amigo / QuickGO
Orthologs
Databases	NCBI: entry; OMA: entry
Species	Human	Mouse
Entrez	65010	171429
Ensembl	ENSG00000225697	ENSMUSG00000023259
UniProt	Q9BXS9	Q8CIW6
RefSeq (mRNA)	NM_134426; NM_001040454; NM_001281732; NM_001281733; NM_022911 NM_134263	NM_134420
RefSeq (protein)	NP_001035544; NP_001268661; NP_001268662; NP_075062; NP_599025 NP_602298; NP_001035544.1	NP_599252; NP_001395316
Location (UCSC)	Chr 3: 48.63 – 48.64 Mb	Chr 9: 108.73 – 108.74 Mb
PubMed search
- Wikidata
View/Edit Human	View/Edit Mouse

Solute carrier family 26 member 6 is a protein that in humans is encoded by the SLC26A6 gene. It is an anion-exchanger expressed in the apical membrane of the kidney proximal tubule, the apical membranes of the duct cells in the pancreas, and the villi of the duodenum.

This gene belongs to the solute carrier 26 family, whose members encode anion transporter proteins. This particular family member encodes a protein involved in transporting chloride, oxalate, sulfate and bicarbonate. Several alternatively spliced transcript variants of this gene, encoding distinct isoforms, have been described, but the full-length nature of some of these variants has not been determined.

== Associated diseases ==
Diseases associated with SLC26A6 include sialolithiasis and urolithiasis.

== See also ==
- Solute carrier family
