= C15orf39 =

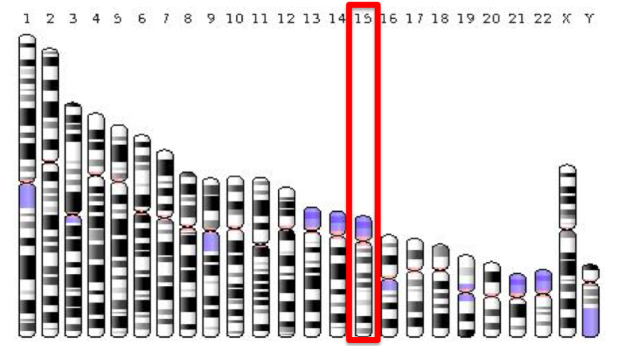

Identifiers
- Aliases: C15orf39, chromosome 15 open reading frame 39
- External IDs: MGI: 1921461; GeneCards: C15orf39

Gene location (Mouse)
Chr.	Chromosome 9 (mouse)
Band	9 B|9 30.89 cM	Start	57,160,400 bp
Band	9 B|9 30.89 cM	End	57,169,895 bp
RNA expression pattern
Bgee	Human / Mouse (ortholog); Top expressed in: monocyte; blood; popliteal artery; right coronary artery; bone marrow cell; spleen; left coronary artery; left uterine tube; upper lobe of left lung; right adrenal gland / Top expressed in: spermatocyte; lacrimal gland; seminiferous tubule; spermatid; stroma of bone marrow; olfactory epithelium; secondary oocyte; submandibular gland; zygote; Gonadal ridge; More reference expression data
BioGPS	n/a
Orthologs
Databases	NCBI: entry
Species	Human	Mouse
Entrez	56905	74211
Ensembl	n/a	ENSMUSG00000032300
UniProt	Q6ZRI6	Q3TEI4
RefSeq (mRNA)	NM_015492	NM_028820
RefSeq (protein)	NP_056307	NP_083096
Location (UCSC)	n/a	Chr 9: 57.16 – 57.17 Mb
PubMed search
- Wikidata
View/Edit Human	View/Edit Mouse

C15orf39
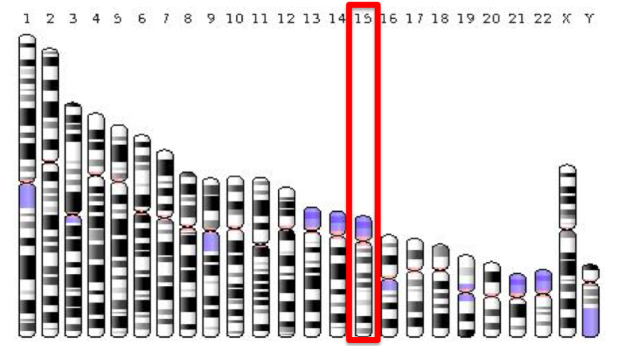
- Chromosome 15

Identifiers
- Symbol: C15orf39
- NCBI gene: 56905
- HGNC: 24497
- RefSeq: NP_056307.2
- UniProt: Q6ZRI6
Search for
- Structures: Swiss-model
- Domains: InterPro

C15orf39 is a protein that in humans is encoded by the Chromosome 15 open reading frame 15 (C15orf39) gene.

== Gene ==
=== Location ===
C15orf39 is located on chromosome 15 (15q24.2), spanning 16.53kb from 75487985 to 75504515 on the plus DNA strand. C15orf39 has three exons, and seven introns.

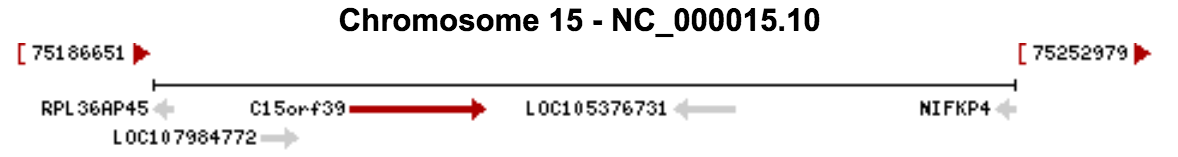
Location of C15orf39 on chromosome 15.

== mRNA ==
=== Isoforms ===
The coding sequence for the C15orf39 mRNA is 4443 base pairs long. The C15orf39 gene produces seven mRNA transcripts, with the longest coding isoform being 1047 amino acids long, and the shortest being 27 amino acids which has a truncated 3' end.

=== Expression ===
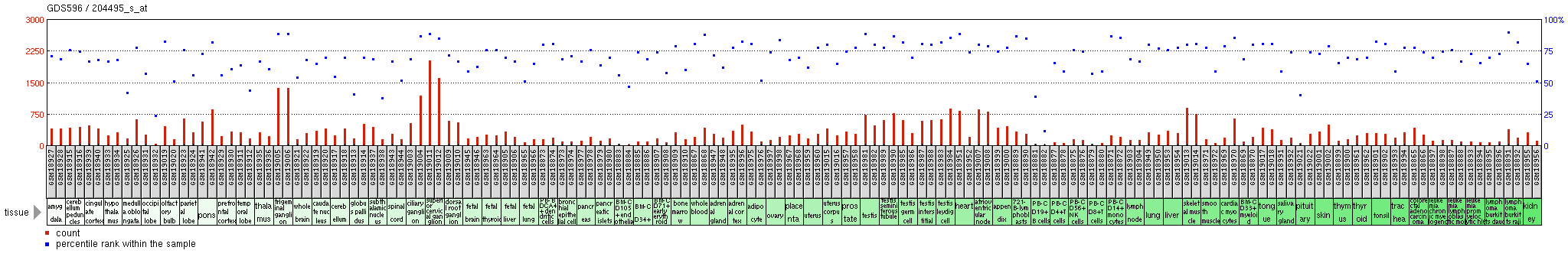
Expression of C15orf39 in human tissues.

C15orf39 is highly expressed in the trigeminal ganglion, superior cervical ganglion, whole blood, and the heart. Low expression levels of C15orf39 were found in the occipital lobe and PB-CD19+ B-cells.

.

.

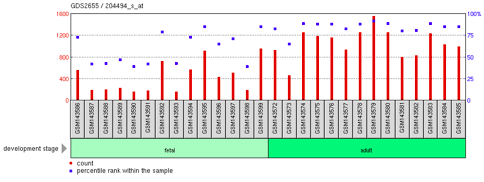
In-situ hybridization of C15orf39 in fetal and adult reticulocytes.

C15orf39 expression levels in fetal and adult reticulocytes showed significantly different levels of expression (P < 0.0001), with adult reticulocytes expressing more C15orf39 than fetal cells.

.

.

.

.

== Protein ==
=== General properties ===
C15orf39 has an unmodified molecular mass of 110.6 kDA. The modified molecular mass is 110.7 kDA. C15orf39 is composed of an above average level of proline (≈17%), and is deficient in isoleucine (≈1%) and asparagine (≈1%). Both close (Thirteen-lined ground squirrel) and distant (Crested-Ibis) orthologs contained above average levels of proline, and low levels of isoleucine, and asparagine.

=== Domains and motifs ===
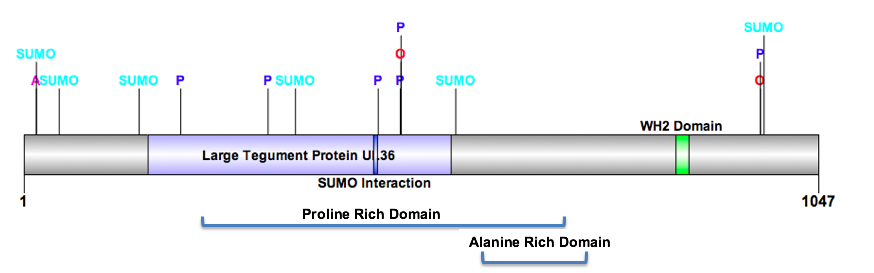
Domains of C15orf39. P = Phosphorylation, A = Acetylation, SUMO = Sumoylation, O = O-glycosylation.

C15orf39 has four predicted domains. Two of which, are the proline rich and alanine rich domains. The large tegument protein UL36 domain is important in the regulation of the viral cycle of Human Herpes Virus 1 (HHV-1), including transporting the viral capsid to the nuclear pore complex, and linking the inner and outer viral tegument capsids together. Lastly, the WH2 domain, WASP-homology domain 2, is approximately 18 amino acids long, and serves as an actin binding domain. WH2 binds actin monomers enabling the production of actin filaments.

=== Post-translational modifications ===
The predicted post-translational modifications for C15orf39 include phosphorylation, acetylation, sumoylation, and o-glycosylation. An amino acid of importance is K17, which has an acetyl and sumo-group covalently attached. Also, T970, which is phosphorylated and has an o-glycosyl group attached. All predicted post-translational modifications were conserved in distant and strict orthologs.

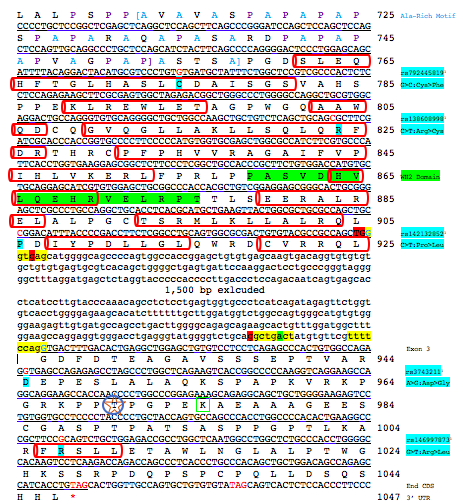
Conceptual translation of C15orf39 C-terminal showing predicted PTM and secondary structure.

PTM	Amino Acid Location
Phosphorylation	S208, S322, S467, S496, S497, T970
Acetylation	K17
Sumoylation	K17, K57, K154, K358, K569, K975
Sumoylation Interaction	462-466
O-Glycosylation	S497, T970

_{.}

_{.}

.

.

.

=== Structure ===
Alpha helices predicted in the C15orf39 protein are colored red, and random coils are represented as tan. No beta sheets were predicted to be part of the secondary structure for C15orf39. The amino acids not modeled were predicted to be random coils.

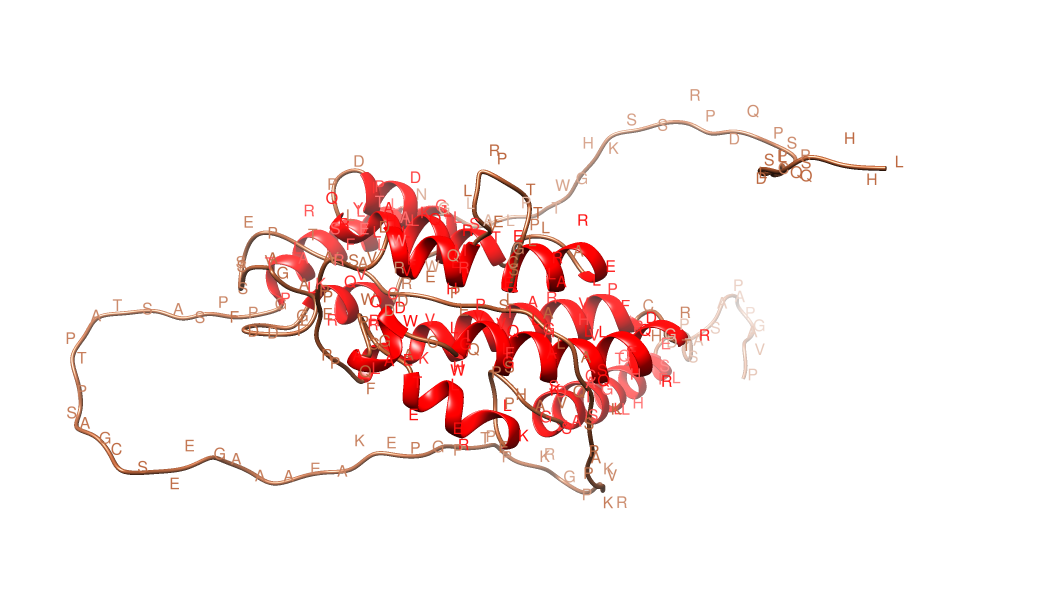
Predicted tertiary structure for C-terminal end of C15orf39.

=== Sub-cellular localization ===
C15orf39 is predicted to be located in the cytosol of the cell.

=== Protein interactions ===
Protein interaction screenings have shown C15orf39 to interact with many proteins, including RPLP1 and EIF4ENIF1. C15orf39 was discovered to interact with RPLP1 (Large Ribosomal Subunit Protein P1), a cytoplasmic protein, in a high-output yeast two-hybrid screening. RPLP1 is an acidic ribosomal subunit that is important in the elongation step of transcription. EIF4ENIF1 (Eukaryotic Translation Initiation Factor 4E Transporter), is a nucleocytoplasmic protein that shuttles the translation initiation factor eIF4E between the nucleus and cytoplasm. The protein interaction between C15orf39 and EIF4ENIF1 was discovered through affinity capture.

== Homology ==
=== Paralogs ===
There are no known paralogs for the human C15orf39 gene.

=== Orthologs ===
The ortholog space for C15orf39 includes relatives as distant as the cartilaginous fish like Rhincodon typus (whale shark), and as strict as closely related mammals like the Gorilla, which has 99% sequence identity to the human protein. The phylogenetic tree below, shows the evolutionary relationship of the C15orf39 protein sequence in its orthologs.

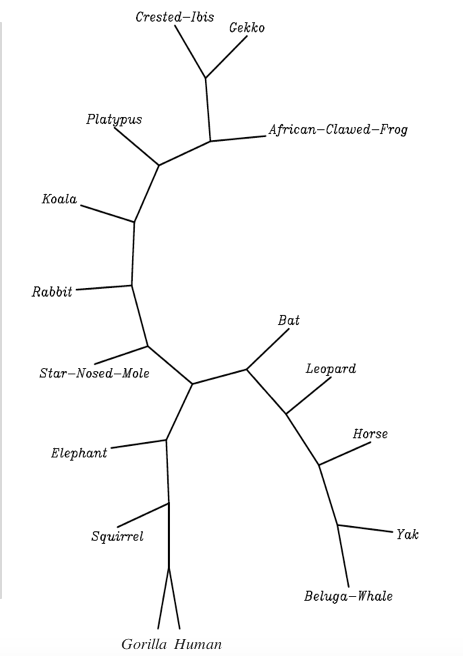
Phylogenetic tree for select C15orf39 orthologs.

Scientific Name	Common name	MYA	Protein Accession #	Length (AA)	% Identity
Homo sapiens	Human	0	NP_056307	1,047	100
Gorilla gorilla gorilla	Gorilla	9.06	XP_004056588.1	1,047	99
Ictidomys tridecemlineatus	Thirteen-lined ground squirrel	90	XP_005316869.1	1,032	80
Equus caballus	Horse	96	XP_023509136.1	1,033	79
Delphinapterus leucas	Beluga Whale	96	XP_022435768.1	1,041	78
Loxodonta africana	African Bush Elephant	105	XP_003413993.1	1,072	75
Omithorhynchus anatinus	Platypus	177	XP_007656779.1	1,119	37
Gekko japonicus	Gekko Japonicus	312	XP_015267003.1	1,387	51
Nipponia Nippon	Crested Ibis	312	XP_009468021.1	1,046	32
Xenopus laevis	African Clawed Frog	352	XP_018111022.1	1,475	40
Rhincodon typus	Whale Shark	473	XP_020392571.1	1,491	31

=== Divergence ===
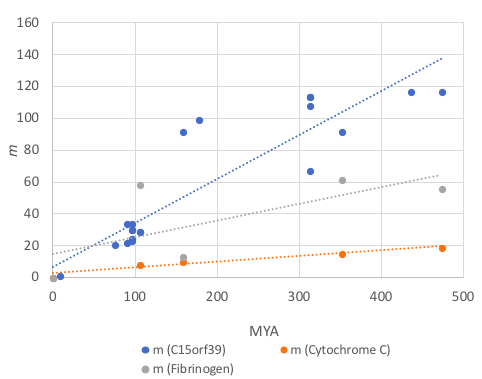
Rate of sequence divergence for C15orf39, Fibrinogen, and Cytochrome C in orthologs.

The graph displays that the C15orf39 protein is quickly evolving. C15orf39's sequence has diverged at a quicker rate than the quickly evolving fibrinogen protein in humans.
