= Nucleobase cation symporter-2 =

Family of transport proteins

Xanthine/uracil/vitamin C permease

Identifiers
- Symbol: Xan_ur_permease
- Pfam: PF00860
- Pfam clan: CL0062
- InterPro: IPR006043
- PROSITE: PDOC00860
- TCDB: 2.A.40
- OPM superfamily: 64
- OPM protein: 3qe7
Available protein structures:
- PDB: IPR006043 PF00860 (ECOD; PDBsum)
- AlphaFold: IPR006043; PF00860

The Nucleobase cation symporter-2 (NCS2) family, also called the Nucleobase ascorbate transporter (NAT) family, consists of over 1000 sequenced proteins derived from gram-negative and gram-positive bacteria, archaea, fungi, plants and animals. The NCS2/NAT family is a member of the APC Superfamily of secondary carriers. Of the five known families of transporters that act on nucleobases, NCS2/NAT is the only one that is most widespread. Many functionally characterized members are specific for nucleobases including both purines and pyrimidines, but others are purine-specific. However, two closely related rat/human members of the family, SVCT1 and SVCT2, localized to different tissues of the body, co-transport L-ascorbate (vitamin C) and Na^{+} with a high degree of specificity and high affinity for the vitamin. Clustering of NCS2/NAT family members on the phylogenetic tree is complex, with bacterial proteins and eukaryotic proteins each falling into at least three distinct clusters. The plant and animal proteins cluster loosely together, but the fungal proteins branch from one of the three bacterial clusters forming a tighter grouping. E. coli possesses four distantly related paralogous members of the NCS2 family.

== Structure ==
Proteins of the NCS2 family are 414–650 amino acyl residues in length and probably possess 14 TMSs. Lu et al. (2011) have concluded from x-ray crystallography that UraA (2.A.40.1.1) has 14 TMSs with two 7 TMS inverted repeats. Uracil is located at the interface between the two domains.

=== Crystal structures ===
Uracil permease, UraA UraA with bound uracil at 2.8Å resolution PDB: 3QE7.

== Transport reaction ==
The generalized transport reactions catalyzed by proteins of the NAT/NCS2 family are:

Nucleobase (out) H^{+} (out) → Nucleobase (in) H^{+} (in).

Ascorbate (out) Na^{+} (out) → Ascorbate (in) Na^{+} (in).

== Characterized proteins ==
Several proteins make up the NCS2/NAT family. A full list of these proteins can be found in the Transporter Classification Database. A few types of proteins that make up the NCS2/NAT family include:

- Xanthine permeases, including PbuX (XanP) of Bacillus subtilis (TC# 2.A.40.3.1), involved in cellular xanthine transport.
- Uric acid permeases, including PucJ of Bacillus subtilus (TC# 2.A.40.3.2), which promotes uptake of uric acid into the cell in limiting-nitrogen conditions.
- Uracil permeases, including UraA of E. coli (TC# 2.A.40.1.1), which facilitates Uracil uptake.
- Pyrimidine permeases, including RutG of E. coli (TC# 2.A.40.1.3)
- Purine permeases, including YcpX of Clostridium perfringens (TC# 2.A.40.2.1)
