= Branched Chain Amino Acid Exporter (LIV-E) Family =

Bacterial protein family

Specific transmembrane protein complexes called Branched Chain Amino Acid Exporters (LIV-E) mediate the export of branched chain amino acids out of prokaryotic cells.

Branched chain amino acids (BCAAs) — isoleucine, leucine, and valine — are critical nutrients in bacterial physiology with roles in protein synthesis and signalling. Regulating the cytosolic level of BCAAs is necessary for cell growth and adaptation. LIV-E transporters are categorized as electrochemical potential-driven transporters, subcategory porters (2.A.78) in the Transporter Classification Database. LIV-E transporters are antiporters that use the proton motive force, catalyzing the import of two hydrogen ions into the cell, to obtain the energy to export one amino acid out of the cell.

All LIV-E complexes are formed from two separate transmembrane proteins. Though no structure of a LIV-E transporter exists, both proteins are necessary for function, and it is assumed they form a heterodimeric complex within the membrane.

== Phylogeny ==
One study in the early 2000s investigated the phylogeny of the LIV-E family. It found that LIV-E transporters are prevalent across many prokaryotic organisms, including archaea and both Gram-positive and Gram-negative bacteria. While many species only encode one LIV-E transporter, other species encode multiple paralogs. Notably, these paralogs are highly divergent, suggesting early gene duplication events and independent functions for each paralog. By contrast, in some species like Methanococcus jannaschii and Neisseria meningitidis, only one of the two components of the transporter, and consistently only the larger component, is found. It is not known if these single genes encode a functional transporter. Multiple instances of highly similar LIV-E transporters have been found in both closely related and distantly related species, suggesting inheritance of LIV-E transporters has occurred both from ancestral lineages and by horizontal gene transfer across divergent species.

== Transporter function ==
Characterized LIV-E transporters include BrnFE in Corynebacterium glutamicum, AzlCD in Bacillus subtilis, and YgaZH in Escherichia coli. The most comprehensive functional characterizations have been conducted on BrnFE. However, the earliest functional role of a LIV-E transporter was described for AzlCD. In Bacillus subtilis, overexpression of AzlCD causes resistance to 4-azaleucine, a toxic analogue of leucine. Despite this function, AzlCD does not likely play a major role in branched-chain amino acid homeostasis in this species.

In Corynebacterium glutamicum, BrnFE exports the branched chain amino acids isoleucine, leucine, and valine, as well as methionine and homoserine. The greatest induction of BrnFE expression occurs under high methionine concentrations, suggesting that methionine may actually be the native substrate rather than a branched-chain amino acid.

== Transporter regulation ==
LIV-E transporters in Gram-negative bacteria have often been found to be regulated by, or even co-transcribed in an operon with, the nutrient regulator Lrp (leucine-responsive protein). The regulon for Lrp is not entirely conserved across species but commonly regulates amino acid uptake and biosynthesis. Lrp activity is induced by interaction with leucine, such that in environments rich in leucine the cell does not expend energy acquiring or producing its own branched-chain amino acids. Co-transcription of Lrp and a LIV-E amino acid exporter creates a negative regulatory feedback loop. Lrp is first expressed and activated under high nutrient conditions, then the LIV-E transporter exports nutrients to lower intracellular concentrations and reduce activation of Lrp, turning off the system.

== Applications in industrial amino acid production ==
The regulatory relationship between Lrp and a LIV-E transporter has been used in both Corynebacterium glutamicum and Escherichia coli, where alterations to either or both Lrp and BrnFE or AzlCD, respectively, lead to an increase in amino acid biosynthesis. As Corynebacterium glutamicum is commonly used in the industrial production of amino acids, these alterations have made important improvements in amino acid yields.

Studies on BrnFE have also enabled the development of a biosensor for high nutrient concentration. The promoter for BrnFE in Corynebacterium glutamicum is induced under high concentrations of methionine and branched-chain amino acids, and Lrp is induced under the same conditions. Researchers created a hybrid construct in which Lrp is driven by the promoter for BrnFE (Lrp-PbrnFE). Further engineering of a desired target gene with an Lrp-binding sequence allows for the specific activation of target gene expression under high concentrations of branched-chain amino acids. This system has been utilized to drive expression of yellow fluorescent protein (YFP) as a visual marker for cells with high intracellular methionine or branched-chain amino acid concentration, facilitating screening for genetic mutants that overproduce these amino acids for industrial applications.
