= SLC38A1 =

Protein-coding gene in the species Homo sapiens

Identifiers
- Aliases: SLC38A1, ATA1, NAT2, SAT1, SNAT1, solute carrier family 38 member 1
- External IDs: OMIM: 608490; MGI: 2145895; GeneCards: SLC38A1

Gene location (Human)
Chr.	Chromosome 12 (human)
Band	12q13.11	Start	46,183,063 bp
Band	12q13.11	End	46,270,017 bp

Gene location (Mouse)
Chr.	Chromosome 15 (mouse)
Band	15|15 F1	Start	96,469,299 bp
Band	15|15 F1	End	96,540,794 bp
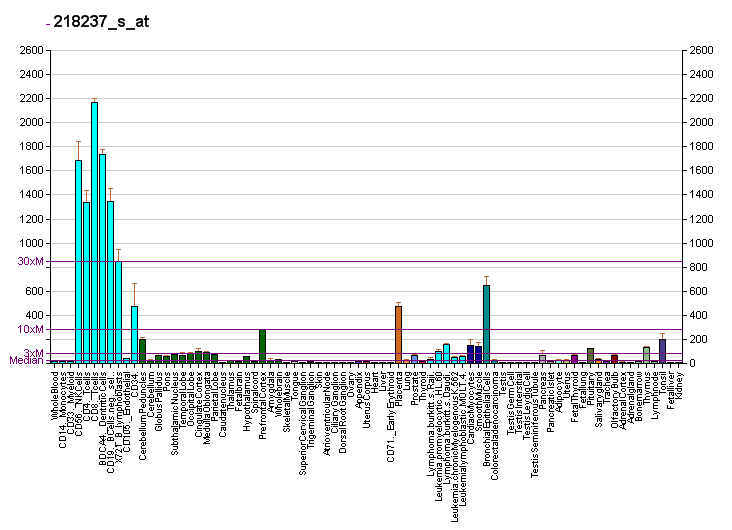
RNA expression pattern
Bgee	Human / Mouse (ortholog); Top expressed in: lateral nuclear group of thalamus; seminal vesicula; superficial temporal artery; mucosa of sigmoid colon; middle temporal gyrus; pars compacta; body of tongue; Brodmann area 23; cerebellar vermis; external globus pallidus / Top expressed in: deep cerebellar nuclei; inferior colliculi; retinal pigment epithelium; habenula; dorsal tegmental nucleus; medial vestibular nucleus; superior colliculus; cerebellar vermis; pontine nuclei; ventral tegmental area; More reference expression data
BioGPS	More reference expression data
Gene ontology
Molecular function	neutral amino acid transmembrane transporter activity; protein binding; amino acid:sodium symporter activity; symporter activity; L-amino acid transmembrane transporter activity; amino acid transmembrane transporter activity
Cellular component	integral component of membrane; membrane; plasma membrane; integral component of plasma membrane; extracellular exosome
Biological process	sodium ion transport; neurotransmitter uptake; amino acid transport; neutral amino acid transport; ion transport; L-alpha-amino acid transmembrane transport; amino acid transmembrane transport; L-amino acid transport; transport
Sources:Amigo / QuickGO
Orthologs
Databases	NCBI: entry; OMA: entry
Species	Human	Mouse
Entrez	81539	105727
Ensembl	ENSG00000111371	ENSMUSG00000023169
UniProt	Q9H2H9	Q8K2P7
RefSeq (mRNA)	NM_001077484; NM_001278387; NM_001278388; NM_001278389; NM_001278390 NM_030674	NM_001166456; NM_001166458; NM_134086
RefSeq (protein)	NP_001070952; NP_001265316; NP_001265317; NP_001265318; NP_001265319 NP_109599	NP_001159928; NP_001159930; NP_598847
Location (UCSC)	Chr 12: 46.18 – 46.27 Mb	Chr 15: 96.47 – 96.54 Mb
PubMed search
- Wikidata
View/Edit Human	View/Edit Mouse

Sodium-coupled neutral amino acid transporter 1 is a protein that in humans is encoded by the SLC38A1 gene.

Amino acid transporters play essential roles in the uptake of nutrients, production of energy, chemical metabolism, detoxification, and neurotransmitter cycling. SLC38A1 is an important transporter of glutamine, an intermediate in the detoxification of ammonia and the production of urea. Glutamine serves as a precursor for the synaptic transmitter, glutamate (Gu et al., 2001).[supplied by OMIM]
