= Bacterial Leucine Transporter =

Bundled twelve alpha helix protein

- Molecular dynamics simulation of LeuT generated using GROMACS

Identifiers
- Symbol: LeuT
- PDB: 3F3E
- RefSeq: NC_000918.1. NP_214423.1. NC_000918.1.
- UniProt: O67854
Search for
- Structures: Swiss-model
- Domains: InterPro

Bacterial Leucine Transporter (LeuT) is a bundled twelve alpha helix protein which belongs to the family of transporters that shuttle amino acids in and out of bacterial cells. Specialized in small hydrophobic amino acids such as leucine and alanine, this transporter is powered by the gradient of sodium ions that is normally maintained by healthy cells across their membranes. LeuT acts as a symporter, which means that it links the passage of a sodium ion across the cell membrane with the transport of the amino acid in the same direction. It was first crystallized to understand the inner molecular mechanisms of how antidepressants work, as it has a close resemblance with the human neurotransmitter transporters (more difficult to crystallize) that these drugs block, thus inhibiting the reuptake of chemical messengers across the cell membrane of nerve axons and glial cells.

== Structure ==
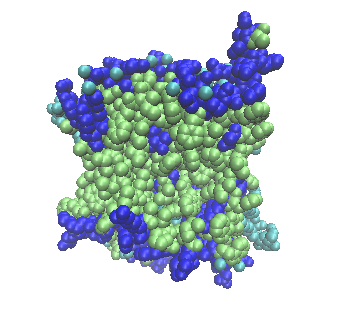
Representation of LeuT. Polar residues are shown in blue and non polar in green. Image generated using VMD from PDB file 3F3E.

LeuT is a homodimer composed by two identical subunits which are in contact in two points. Each of these polypeptide chains is about 70 tall and has a diameter of 48 . Its formula weight is 58078.2 Da.

It is mainly made of hydrophobic residues. These are in contact with the inside of the bilayer, while the hydrophilic residues are in contact with the extracellular and intracellular space. Taking into account that it is a transmembrane protein, this is a relevant characteristic, as it can interact both with water and phospholipids.

This transporter's secondary structure consists of twelve alpha helices and two short beta strands. Some loops can also be found linking them.

As LeuT is a symporter and uses the electrochemical potential of sodium ions to facilitate leucine's transport, both sodium ions and the hydrophobic amino acid, Leucine (Leu), bind to the centre of this protein. The residues involved in this binding are situated on the transmembrane alpha helix segments 1, 3, 6 and 8.

== Function ==
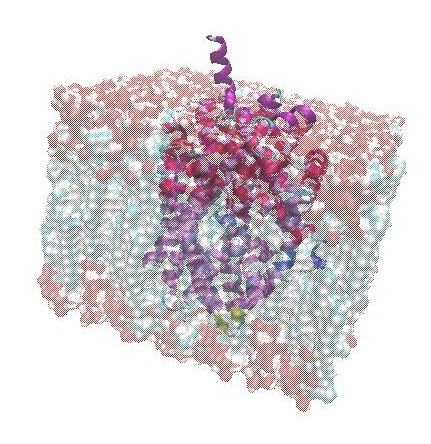
LeuT embedded in the membrane. Image generated using VMD from PDB file 3F3E.

Bacterial Leucine Transporter imports leucine from the outside of the cell to the inside with the aid of two sodium ions. It is a homologue of the proteins that remove chemical transmitters from the synapse and assist neurotransmission such as serotonin, dopamine, noradrenaline, glycine or GABA (-aminobutyric acid) transporters in neurons. These specific transport proteins clear the synapse after a nerve signal, transporting neurotransmitters back into the axon and making it ready for another signal.

LeuT is one of the dozens of transporters that shuttle amino acids in and out of bacterial cells. Leucine and alanine are the main amino acids that this protein brings across the membrane since it has a high affinity for these small hydrophobic molecules. Moreover, the hydrophobic character of the protein surface complements well the hydrophobic character of the cell membrane. The transport is powered by the gradient of sodium ions, which generates a difference of electric potential between the inner and extracellular space. LeuT acts as a symporter, an integral membrane protein that works as a cotransporter linking the passage of two sodium ions across the membrane with the transport of the amino acid in the same direction thus making the process energetically favorable. The concentration difference creates an electrochemical potential gradient that is used to catalyze the uptake of organic substrates (in this case leucine). The transport is not dependent on any other source of energy (for example, ATP).

Leucine transporter, like the neurotransmitter transporters in nerve cells, has a bundle of twelve alpha helices that form a transport channel through the membrane. For that, this bacterial protein is providing a powerful model for studying the atomic details of these nerve proteins. The human homologues of LeuT are dependent on chlorine ions as well as sodium ions concentration: they all belong to a class of Na+/Cl- dependent transporters.

== Conformational change ==
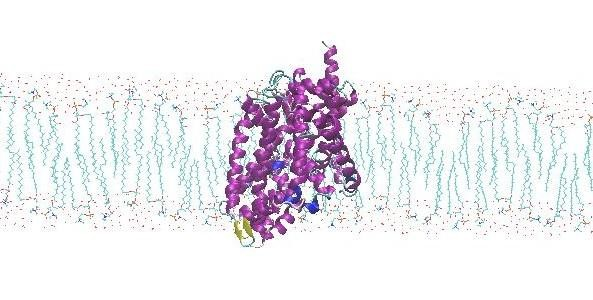
2D-view of LeuT embedded in the membrane. Image generated using VMD from PDB file 3F3E.

The protein is thought to act like a rocker switch. It opens toward the extracellular space so that leucine and sodium ions can enter and bind to it. After that, LeuT undergoes a conformational change that releases both particles into the inside of the cell. Two sets of alpha helices are thought to perform the rocking action by directly changing its shape after the binding of the amino acid to the structure. This change is necessary for the protein to be functional. If a drug such as an antidepressant is bound to it, the transport activity is dramatically reduced.

== Binding to antidepressants ==
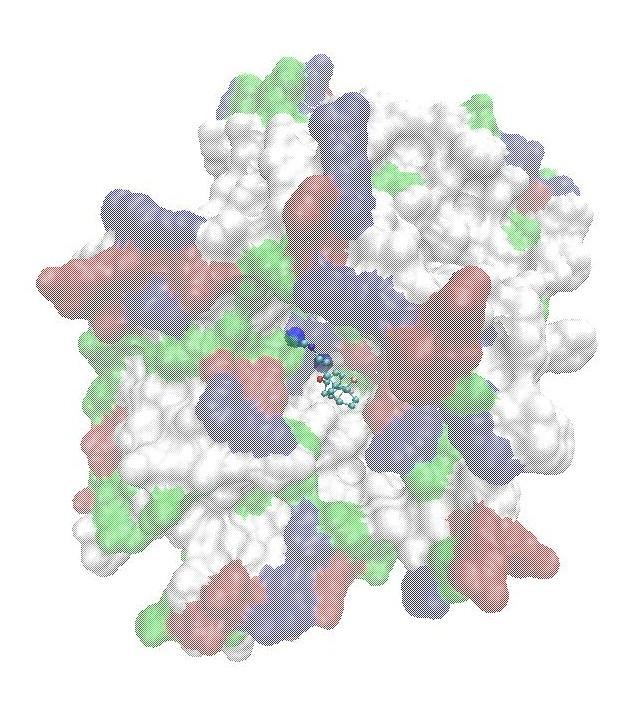
Top-down view of LeuT with Citalopram bound to it. In the center of the protein there can be found the two sodium ions (labelled in blue) that are used to symport leucine through the transporter. This image was generated using Autodock from PDB file 3F3E.

LeuT was first crystallized by the New York Consortium on Membrane Protein Structure (NYCOMPS) and other researchers from the bacteria species Aquifex aeolicus with the aim of understanding the underlying molecular mechanisms of antidepressants binding to their target proteins, the neurotransmitter transporters. As these proteins have proven difficult to be crystallized, LeuT emerged as a promising homologue for the docking of these drugs.

Antidepressants such as selective serotonin reuptake inhibitors (SSRIs) bind in the large cavity at the outer entrance of the protein, not directly by competitively inhibiting the binding site for leucine, but presumably blocking the motion of the protein that is necessary for undergoing the conformational change that leads to the release of leucine. These are held by a hairpin loop and a salt bridge enclosed by leucine (Leu25/Leu29), glycine (Gly26), arginine (Arg30), tyrosine (Tyr108), isoleucine (Ile111) and phenylalanine (Phe253).

There is some evidence, however, that antidepressants may bind a bit deeper in the opening of human neurotransmitter transporters, due to their differences with LeuT; these are, a more packaged structure and extensions at the ends of the chain that allow them to interact with other proteins in the nerve cell. In line with this, as it can be seen in the image below, the sequence homology between the human sodium-dependent serotonin transporter (the target of SSRIs) and LeuT is only of 21.5%, though the tridimensional structure of both proteins shares a close resemblance.

LeuT is just a first step in this fascinating story. In 2013, the structure of the dopamine transporter was X-ray crystallized; such a success has paved the way to a better comprehension of this process.

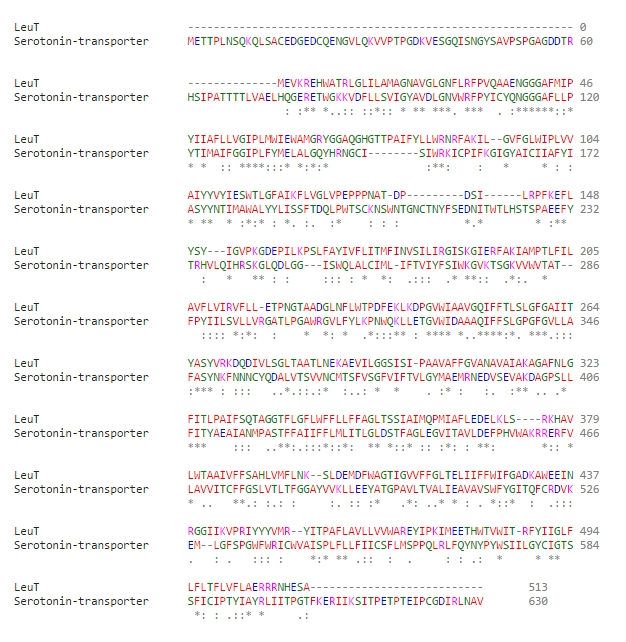

Sequence alignment between the human serotonin transporter and LeuT, generated using Clustal Omega:

"*" accounts for the same aminoacid // ":" accounts for a conserved substitution (same chemical properties) // "." accounts for a semi-conserved substitution (similar structure)

== See also ==
- Active transport
- Membrane transport protein
- Neurotransmitter transporter
- Pharmacology of antidepressants
