= Branched chain amino acid–cation symporter =

The branched chain amino acid:cation symporter (LIVCS) family (TC# 2.A.26) is a member of the APC superfamily. Characterized members of this family transport all three of the branched chain aliphatic amino acids (leucine (L), isoleucine (I) and valine (V)). These proteins are found in Gram-negative and Gram-positive bacteria and function by a Na^{+} or H^{+} symport mechanism. They possess about 440 amino acyl residues and display 12 putative transmembrane helical spanners. As of early 2016, no crystal structures for members of the LIVCS family are available on RCSB.

== Transport reaction ==
The generalized transport reaction is:

[L, I or V] (out) + [Na^{+} or H^{+}] (out) → [L, I or V] (in) + [Na^{+} or H^{+}] (in).

== Proteins ==
As of early 2016, there are 10 known proteins in the LIVCS family. These can be found in the Transporter Classification Database.
