= AAAP family =

Class of transport proteins

Amino Acid/Auxin Permease Family

Identifiers
- Symbol: AAAP
- Pfam: PF01490
- Pfam clan: CL0062
- InterPro: IPR013057
- TCDB: 2.A.18
Available protein structures:
- PDB: IPR013057 PF01490 (ECOD; PDBsum)
- AlphaFold: IPR013057; PF01490

The Amino Acid/Auxin Permease (AAAP) Family (TC# 2.A.18) is a family of secondary carrier proteins, a member of the APC Superfamily that includes hundreds of proteins from plants, animals, fungi and lower eukaryotes. Six AAAPs in A. thaliana are well characterized and transport neutral and charged amino acids with varying specificities and affinities.

== Function ==
Among animal AAAP family members are numerous growth regulating System A and System N isoforms, each exhibiting distinctive tissue and subcellular localizations. The different isoforms also exhibit different relative affinities for the amino acid substrates. Some catalyze H^{+} antiport and can function bidirectionally. Since Systems A are electrogenic which Systems N are not, the amino acid:cation stoichiometries may differ.
