= Phosphate diabetes =

Medical condition

- Phosphate diabetes is X-linked dominant inheritance

Phosphate diabetes is a rare, congenital, hereditary disorder associated with inadequate tubular reabsorption that affects the way the body processes and absorbs phosphate. Also named as X-linked dominant hypophosphatemic rickets (XLH), this disease is caused by a mutation in the X-linked PHEX (phosphate regulating endopeptidase X-linked) gene, which encodes for a protein that regulates phosphate levels in the human body. phosphate is an essential mineral which plays a significant role in the formation and maintenance of bones and teeth, energy production and other important cellular processes. Phosphate diabetes is a condition that falls under the category of tubulopathies, which refers to the pathologies of the renal tubules. The mutated PHEX gene causes pathological elevations in fibroblast growth factor 23 (FGF23), a hormone that regulates phosphate homeostasis by decreasing the reabsorption of phosphate in the kidneys.

Elevated levels of FGF23 in phosphate diabetes lead to an increase in phosphate excretion through urine, thus reducing the phosphate levels in blood. However, due to impaired activation of vitamin D, which plays a crucial role in increasing intestinal calcium and phosphate absorption, patients with this disorder are unable to replenish the lost phosphate. This results in low absorption of phosphate from the gastrointestinal system, leading to a deficiency of phosphate in the body and disrupting the full calcium-phosphate metabolism process.

== Signs and symptoms ==
=== Short stature ===
A common symptom of phosphate diabetes is short stature.

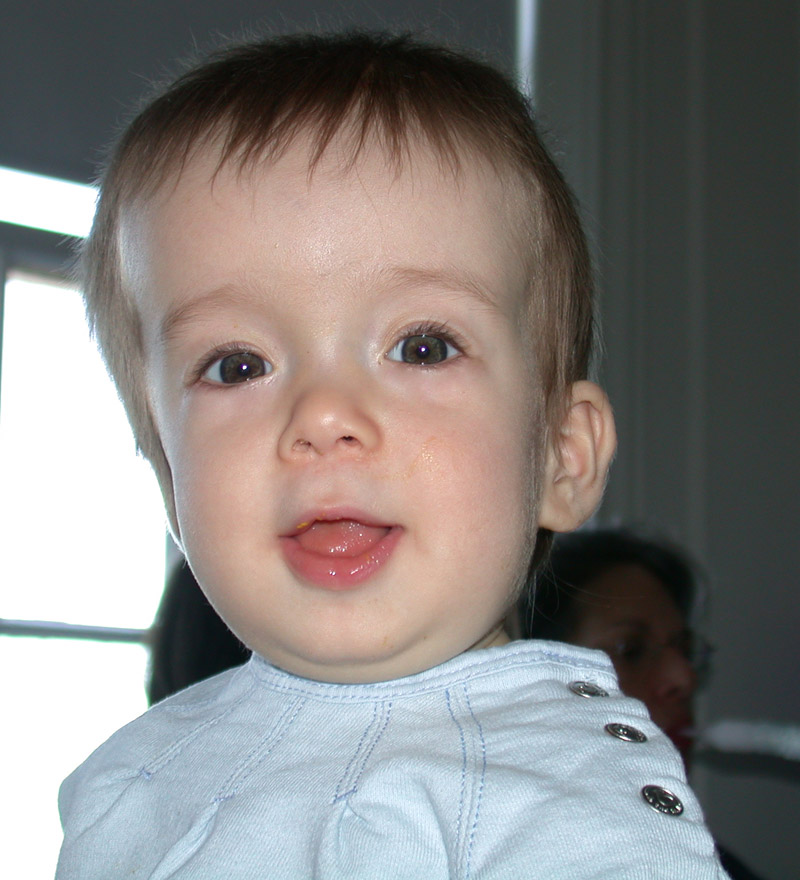
Craniosynostosis in phosphate diabetes

Delayed growth and development are common symptoms of phosphate diabetes in children, resulting in stunted growth and a shorter stature compared to their peers. This symptom is typically one of the earliest indicators of the disorder and may require treatment with growth hormone therapy to promote normal growth and development.

=== Delayed walking ===
Children with phosphate diabetes may start to walk late (at the age of one and a half years and later) due to impaired bone development.

=== Craniosynostosis ===
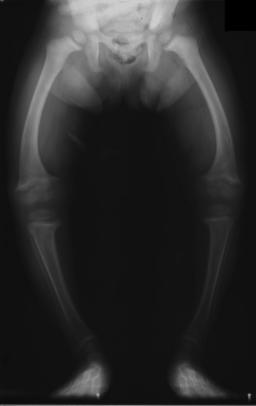
Bowed legs in phosphate diabetes

Children with phosphate diabetes may have a birth defect in which the bones in a baby's skull fuse together too early before the brain is fully formed. This is known as craniosynostosis that may lead to head deformities.

=== Dental problems ===
As phosphate is essential for the formation and maintenance of healthy teeth, phosphate diabetes can lead to a wide range of dental problems, including the formation of cavities, abscesses, and tooth decay.

=== Muscle weakness ===
The deficiency of phosphate may affect muscles, resulting in muscle weakness and fatigue. Patients may have difficulties in performing physical activities and may require physical therapy to improve muscle strength and function.

=== Bowed legs ===
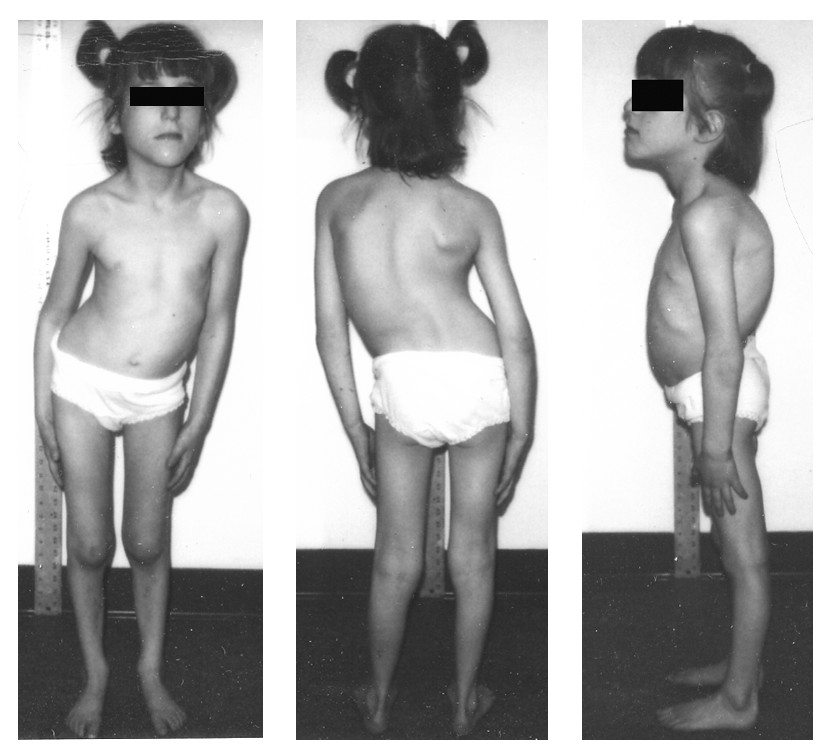
Curvation of spine (Kyphoscoliosis) in phosphate diabetes

Due to phosphate deficiency, patients' bones in the legs may become fragile and brittle, which leads to a characteristic bowing of the legs.

=== Bone pain ===
In phosphate diabetes, the softening of the bones can lead to bone pain, especially in the knees, hips, and lower back.

=== Deformities of the bones (rickets) ===
In severe cases of phosphate diabetes, the deficiency of phosphate can lead to deformities of the bones, resulting in conditions like rickets and osteomalacia (softening of the bones which leads to frequent fractures) and kyphoscoliosis (curvature of the spine).

== Genetics ==
Phosphate diabetes that results from mutations in the PHEX gene is an X-linked dominant disorder, where the mutated gene is located on the X chromosome (one of the sex chromosomes). This inheritance trait is dominant, a single copy of the mutation from the parent is sufficient to cause the disorder in the child.

As males have only one X chromosome (and one Y chromosome), while females have two X chromosomes, the inheritance of phosphate diabetes largely depends on the gender of the parent who carries the mutated gene. Affected fathers with phosphate diabetes are unable to pass the disease to their sons, but all of their daughters will be affected. In contrast, affected mothers with phosphate diabetes will pass the disease to half of their sons and half of their daughters statistically. Thus, this disorder most often occurs in females.

While phosphate diabetes is typically inherited through X-linked dominant inheritance, in some rare cases, the disorder may occur sporadically, meaning that there is no family history of the diseased condition. This may happen due to a new mutation in the PHEX gene which arises during fetal development or due to other genetic factors.

== Pathophysiology ==
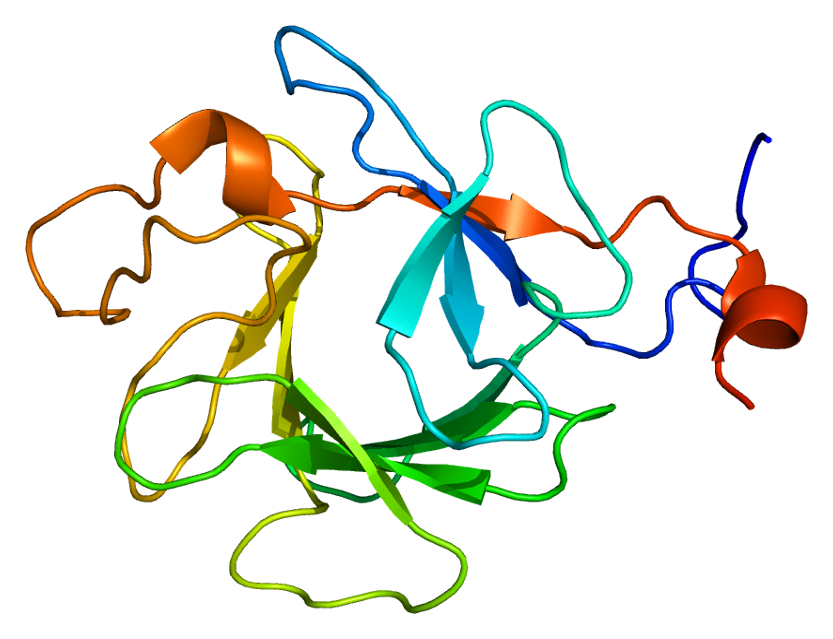
Fibroblast Growth Factor 23 (FGF23)

phosphate diabetes is caused by a genetic mutation in the PHEX gene located on the X chromosome. The PHEX gene encodes for an enzyme called PHEX – phosphate regulating endopeptidase X-linked, which is involved in the regulation of phosphate metabolism in the body.

An occurrence of PHEX gene mutation can lead to an increase in levels of fibroblast growth factor 23 (FGF23), which is a growth factor that regulates phosphate and vitamin D metabolism. Increased levels of FGF23 leads to increase renal phosphate excretion and decrease intestinal phosphate absorption:

=== Renal phosphate Excretion ===
FGF23 acts on the kidneys to reduce the expression of sodium/phosphate co-transporters (NaPi-2a and NaPi-2c) in the proximal tubules. As these co-transporters are responsible for reabsorbing phosphate from urine back into the bloodstream, a decrease in their expression would reduce the amount of phosphate being reabsorbed back to blood, hence increasing the phosphate concentration in the urine being excreted (hypophosphatemia).

=== Intestinal phosphate absorption ===
FGF23 acts on the intestines to reduce the expression of the sodium-phosphate co-transporter (NaPi-2b) in the brush border membrane of enterocytes, which is an important site for nutrient absorption. This transporter facilitates the absorption of phosphate from digested food in the small intestines into the bloodstream. Therefore, reduced activity of the transporter would lower the amount of phosphate being absorbed into the blood, which in turn increases the amount of phosphate excreted in the faeces.

In addition, increased levels of FGF23 would affect vitamin D metabolism and inhibit the action of vitamin D. Vitamin D needs to be converted into its activated form, 1,25-dihydroxyvitamin D, to perform its role of regulating calcium and phosphate absorption in the intestines. A series of enzymatic reactions are required for the activation of vitamin D, and enzymes like 25-hydroxyvitamin D-1α-hydroxylase (CYP27B1) and 1,25-dihydroxyvitamin D-24-hydroxylase (CYP24A1) play an active role in these reactions. However, high levels of FGF23 in blood hinders the activation of vitamin D:

=== Inhibition of CYP27B1 activity ===
FGF23 inhibits the catalytic activity of CYP27B1 in activating vitamin D in the kidneys through a signalling pathway that involves the FGF receptor and downstream intracellular signalling molecules (e.g. FGFRs, MAPK, PI3K etc.). This leads to a decreased levels of activated vitamin D (1,25-dihydroxyvitamin D), which lowers the activity of vitamin D and slows down the absorption of calcium and phosphate in the small intestines.

=== Stimulation of CYP24A1 activity ===
FGF23 stimulates the activity of CYP24A1 in breaking down the activated form of vitamin D. As the availability of activated vitamin D in blood is decreased, the absorption of phosphate into bloodstream is hindered, which further intensifies the systemic phosphate deficiency in the patient's body.

Due to the increased phosphate loss through the excretion of urine and faeces, as well as the reduced absorption of phosphate into blood due to the reduced activity of vitamin D, patients' plasma phosphate levels become lower than normal. This results in a chronic systemic phosphate deficiency that may cause a variety of symptoms with varying degrees of intensity.

== Diagnosis ==
=== Consultation with doctors ===
When the patients' body appear symptoms of phosphate diabetes, they are recommended to go to the hospital for consultation and body check. Doctors specialised in endocrinology and orthopaedics can examine the patient's health condition, and prescribe suitable medicine or arrange referral for further checking.

=== Blood test ===
In phosphate diabetes patients' blood, the phosphate levels are level while calcium and parathyroid hormone (PTH) levels remain to be normal. Blood tests can be performed to measure if there are any abnormalities with the phosphate levels in blood.

==== Urine Test ====
In the urine of phosphate diabetes patients, excess amount of phosphate can be detected due to the impaired reabsorption of phosphate in the kidneys. By testing for the concentration of phosphate in urine, whether the patient is suffering from phosphate diabetes can be determined.

==== X-ray scan ====
X-ray scans of bones can be useful for doctors to assess abnormalities in bone density and detect bone deformities, such as the bowing of the legs, curvature of spines, which are the symptoms of phosphate diabetes.

==== Genetic Analysis ====
Patients with mutations in the PHEX gene usually possess phosphate diabetes. Through the genetic analysis of X chromosome(s) of patients, it can confirm a diagnosis of phosphate diabetes. At the same time, other family members who are at risk of the disease can be identified.

== Prevention ==
=== Genetic screening test ===
Since phosphate diabetes is an inheritable condition, immediate genetic analysis should be performed on a child after birth if one of the parents has been diagnosed with the disorder during childhood. Earlier diagnosis of the disease can facilitate more effective treatments, hence minimising its impact on the child.

== Treatment ==
- Burosumab injection
- Drug therapy for maintaining normal calcium and phosphate levels
- Leg curvature correction

== Epidemiology ==
phosphate diabetes is a rare condition that affects approximately 1 in 20000-25000 individuals, making it relatively difficult to study epidemiologically. However, advances in genetic testing and improved awareness of the condition have led to increased diagnosis rates in recent years.

While phosphate diabetes can affect individuals of any race or ethnicity, it is more common in certain populations, such as those of European and Middle Eastern descent.

== See also ==
- X-linked hypophosphatemia
- Rickets
- Vitamin D deficiency
