= Autosomal dominant hypophosphatemic rickets =

- This condition is inherited in an autosomal dominant manner
- Specialty: Endocrinology

Autosomal dominant hypophosphatemic rickets (ADHR) is a rare hereditary disease in which excessive loss of phosphate in the urine leads to poorly formed bones (rickets), bone pain, and tooth abscesses. ADHR is caused by a mutation in the fibroblast growth factor 23 (FGF23). ADHR affects men and women equally; symptoms may become apparent at any point from childhood through early adulthood. Blood tests reveal low levels of phosphate (hypophosphatemia) and inappropriately normal levels of vitamin D. Occasionally, hypophosphatemia may improve over time as urine losses of phosphate partially correct.

ADHR may be lumped in with X-linked hypophosphatemia under general terms such as hypophosphatemic rickets. Hypophosphatemic rickets are associated with at least nine other genetic mutations. Clinical management of hypophosphatemic rickets may differ depending on the specific mutations associated with an individual case, but treatments are aimed at raising phosphate levels to promote normal bone formation. In a 2019 randomised, clinical trial the rickets in children with X-linked hypophosphataemia treated with a human monoclonal antibody against FGF23 called burosumab improved significantly compared to conventional therapy.
