= Neuter =

Neuter is a Latin adjective meaning "neither", and can refer to:

- Neuter gender, a grammatical gender, a linguistic class of nouns triggering specific types of inflections in associated words
- Neuter pronoun
- Neutering, the sterilization of an animal

== See also ==
- Trap–neuter–return (TNR), an alternative to euthanasia for managing feral cat and dog populations
- UCAN Spay Neuter Clinic, non-profit organization providing spay/neuter as a solution to pet overpopulation
- Neuters, a musical album
- Neuter whose
- Neutra, a surname
- Neutral (disambiguation)
- Neutrino, a nearly massless, electrically neutral subatomic particle
- Neutrogena, a line of cosmetic products
- Neutron, an electrically neutral subatomic particle
- Jimmy Neutron, a cartoon series
- Nutter (disambiguation)
