= Oncogenic osteomalacia =

Oncogenic osteomalacia/tumor induced osteomalacia
- Other names: Tumor-induced osteomalacia

Essentially a metabolic, phosphate-wasting disorder (not cancer), oncogenic osteomalacia, also known as tumor-induced osteomalacia/hypophosphatemic osteomalacia, is an uncommon disorder resulting in increased renal phosphate excretion, hypophosphatemia and osteomalacia. It is most often caused by small and benign, phosphaturic mesenchymal growths which secrete phosphatonins such as FGF23, matrix extracellular phosphoglycoprotein, secreted frizzled-related protein 4 or FGF7, which drive renal phosphate wasting. These slow-growing, benign tumors are classically found anywhere in the body. Symptoms typically include crushing fatigue, severe muscle weakness and brain fog due to the low circulating levels of serum phosphate.

== Signs and symptoms ==
Adult patients may present with worsening musculoskeletal symptoms, muscle weakness, myalgia, bone pain and fatigue which are followed by recurrent bone fractures. Children present with difficulty in walking, stunted growth and deformities of the skeleton (features of rickets). There can also be a significant delay between the beginning of symptoms to diagnosis, which research reflects as being between 2.5 and 28 years.

== Cause ==
Tumor-induced osteomalacia is usually referred to as a paraneoplastic phenomenon, however, the tumors are usually benign and the symptomatology is due to osteomalacia or rickets. A benign mesenchymal or mixed connective tissue tumor (usually phosphaturic mesenchymal tumor and hemangiopericytoma) are the most common associated tumors. A link to mesenchymal malignant tumors, such as osteosarcoma and fibrosarcoma, is exceedingly rare but has been reported. Locating the tumor can prove to be difficult and may require whole body MRI. Some of the tumors express somatostatin receptors and may be located by octreotide scanning.

A phosphaturic mesenchymal tumor is an extremely rare benign neoplasm of soft tissue and bone that inappropriately produces fibroblast growth factor 23. This tumor may cause tumor-induced osteomalacia, a paraneoplastic syndrome, by the secretion of FGF23, which has phosphaturic activity (by inhibition of renal tubular reabsorption of phosphate and renal conversion of 25-hydroxyvitamin D to 1,25-dihydroxyvitamin D). The paraneoplastic effects can be debilitating and are only reversed on discovery and surgical resection of the tumor.

== Pathogenesis ==
FGF23 (fibroblast growth factor 23), and likely other phosphatonins, inhibit phosphate transport in the renal tubule and reduce calcitriol production by the kidney. Tumor production of FGF23, Secreted frizzled-related protein 4 and matrix extracellular phosphoglycoprotein (MEPE) have all been identified as possible causative agents for the hypophosphatemia.

== Diagnosis ==
Biochemical studies reveal hypophosphatemia (low blood phosphate), elevated alkaline phosphatase and low serum 1,25 dihydroxyvitamin D levels. Routine laboratory tests may not include serum phosphate levels and this can result in considerable delay in diagnosis. Even when low phosphate is measured, its significance is often overlooked. The next most appropriate test is measurement of urine phosphate levels. If there is inappropriately high urine phosphate (phosphaturia) in the setting of low serum phosphate (hypophosphatemia), there should be a high suspicion for tumor-induced osteomalacia. FGF23 (see below) can be measured to confirm the diagnosis but this test is not widely available.

Once hypophosphatemia and phosphaturia have been identified, begin a search for the causative tumor, which may be small and difficult to detect. Gallium-68 DOTA-Octreotate (DOTA-TATE) positron emission tomography (PET) scanning is the best way to locate these tumors. If this scan is not available, other options include Indium-111 Octreotide (Octreoscan) SPECT/CT, whole body CT or MRI imaging.

=== Differential diagnosis ===
Serum chemistries are identical in tumor-induced osteomalacia, X-linked hypophosphatemic rickets (XHR) and autosomal dominant hypophosphatemic rickets (ADHR). A negative family history can be useful in distinguishing tumor induced osteomalacia from XHR and ADHR. If necessary, genetic testing for PHEX (phosphate regulating gene with homologies to endopeptidase on the X-chromosome) can be used to conclusively diagnose XHR and testing for the FGF23 gene will identify patients with ADHR.

== Treatment ==
Resection of the tumor is the ideal treatment and results in correction of hypophosphatemia (and low calcitriol levels) within hours of resection. Resolution of skeletal abnormalities may take many months.

If the tumor cannot be located, begin treatment with calcitriol (1–3 μg/day) and phosphate supplementation (1–4 g/day in divided doses). Tumors that express somatostatin receptors may respond to treatment with octreotide. If hypophosphatemia persists despite calcitriol and phosphate supplementation, administration of cinacalcet has been shown to be useful.
