= UCAN =

Ucan or UCAN may refer to:

- Catholic University of Angola (Portuguese: Universidade Católica de Angola), Luanda, Angola
- Uchen script, a style of the Tibetan alphabet
- Union of Catholic Asian News, a news agency
- United Coalition for Animals, an American animal welfare organization
- University of Canberra, Australia
- University and College Accountability Network, an American university ranking database
- Salih Uçan (born 1994), Turkish footballer
