= Rachitic rosary =

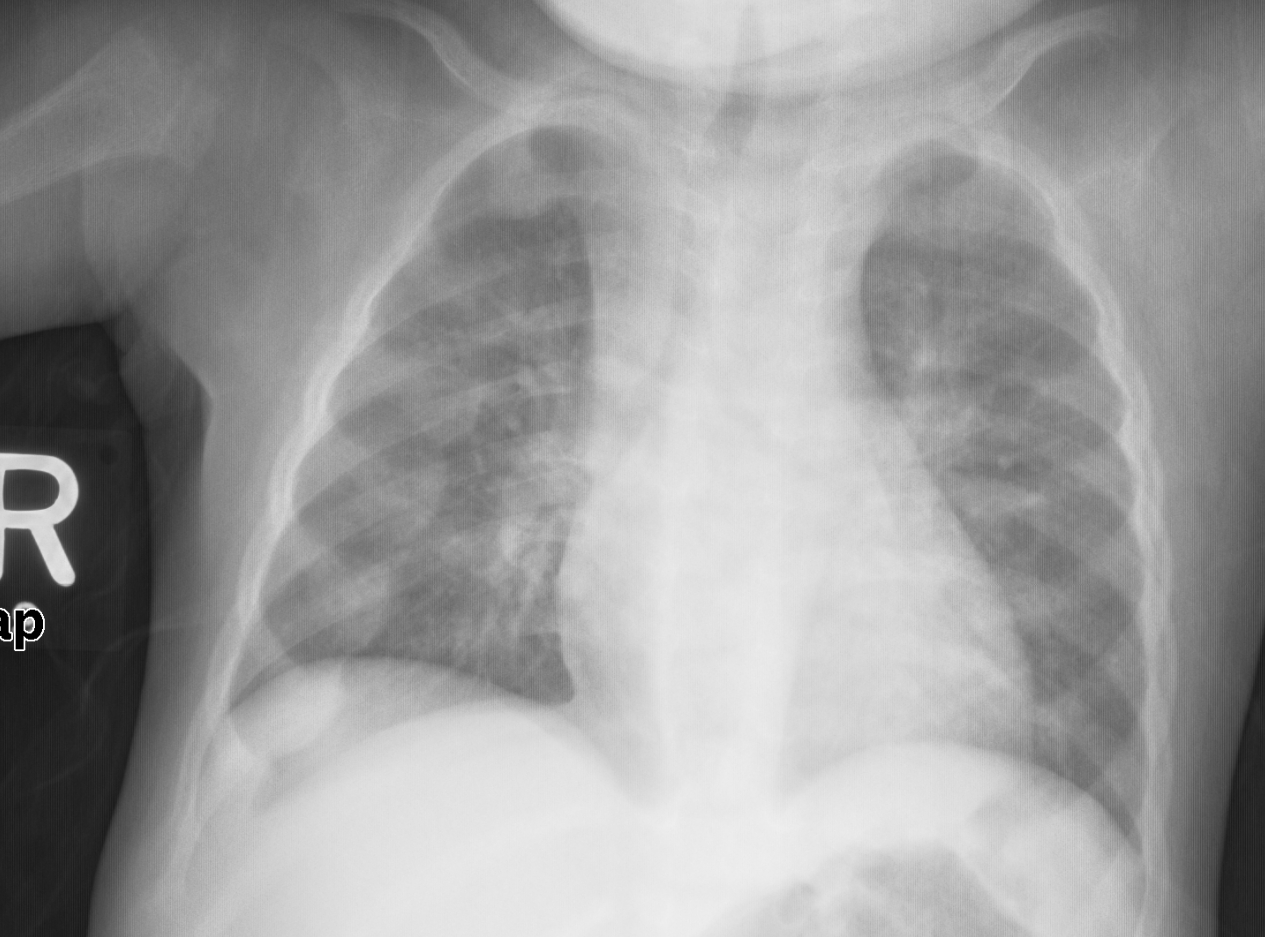
- Rachitic rosary on chest radiograph

The rachitic rosary or beading of the ribs are the prominent knobs of bone at the costochondral joints of rickets patients. The knobs create the appearance of large beads under the skin of the rib cage, hence the name by analogy with the beads of a Catholic Christian rosary.

== Pathophysiology ==
In rickets, deficient or impaired vitamin D activity reduces intestinal calcium absorption, resulting in hypocalcemia. This stimulates parathyroid hormone secretion, which exacerbates phosphate loss and further depletes calcium reserves.

Rachitic rosary results from calcium deficiency, which disrupts the mineralization of osteoid and cartilage at the costochondral junctions, leading to the accumulation and excessive proliferation of uncalcified growth plate cartilage, forming palpable bony swellings.

Rickets is the most common cause of rachitic rosary, however its presence has also been noted in tumor-induced osteomalacia, primary hyperparathyroidism, and beta-thalassemia. It is usually seen in infants or children.

== Diagnosis ==
Rachitic rosary may be felt during palpitation on a physical exam, or can be seen on a chest X-ray. In severe cases including malnutrition, the bony protrusions may be seen through the skin.

Scorbutic rosary is a differential diagnosis for rachitic rosary. Scorbutic rosary may present as beading at the costochondral junctions in cases of advanced scurvy in children. It may be distinguished from rachitic rosary on radiographic imaging by its more angular appearance and the presence of an abrupt irregularity at the costochondral junction.

== Management ==
With the underlying cause treated, rachitic rosary may resolve on its own. If identified and treated early, nutritional rickets has a good prognosis.
