= Phosphate supplement =

Phosphate supplementation is used to treat hypophosphatemia.

Most hypophosphatemia occurs when phosphate leaves the circulation and enters the cells. Phosphate supplementation is often required in people who have undergone surgery and in chronically malnourished people.

Sodium phosphate and potassium phosphate can be administered intravenously or orally. Tablets combining the forms are also available.

Phosphate is primary excreted in the urine, at the distal renal tubule.
