= Neutra =

Neutra is a surname. Notable people with the surname include:

- Dion Neutra (1926–2019), American architect
- Richard Neutra (1892–1970), Austrian-American architect

== See also ==
- Neutra, the German name for Nitra, a city in Slovakia
- Neutra Phos, a powder formulation of sodium and potassium phosphate
