= Neutral =

Neutral or neutrality may refer to:

== Mathematics and natural science ==
=== Biology ===
- Neutral organisms, in ecology, those that obey the unified neutral theory of biodiversity

=== Chemistry and physics ===
- Neutralization (chemistry), a chemical reaction in which an acid and a base react quantitatively with each other
- Neutral solution, a chemical solution which is neither acidic nor basic
- Neutral particle, a particle without electrical charge

=== Mathematics ===
- Neutral element or identity element, in mathematics, a special element with respect to a binary operation, such that if the operation is applied to any element in a set, that element is unchanged
- Neutral vector, a multivariate random variable that exhibits a particular type of statistical independence (Dirichlet distribution)

== Philosophy ==
- Neutrality (philosophy), the absence of declared or intentional bias
- Neutrality (psychoanalysis)
- Neutral level, the physical or material traces of esthesic and poietic processes identified in semiotics

== Politics ==
- Neutral country, a polity such as a state that favors or supports none of the parties involved in a disagreement, conflict, or war

=== Political principles ===
- Neutral point of view, a stance or tone that is free from bias (see journalistic objectivity)
- Gender neutrality, a principle which advocates gender equality practices and behaviors which are neutral in regard to gender
- Humanitarian neutrality, a principle governing humanitarian responses
- Medical neutrality, a principle of noninterference with medical services in times of armed conflict and civil unrest
- Network neutrality, a principle which advocates that all data on the Internet be treated equally
- Search neutrality, a principle that search engines should have no editorial policies other than that their results be comprehensive, impartial and based solely on relevance
- Neutrality (social choice), a principle that a voting rule should not discriminate apriori between candidates.

=== Other uses in politics ===
- Neutrality of money, the notion that a change in the supply of money in an economy has no tangible effects
- Neutral Confederacy, historic Indigenous people of the Northeastern Woodlands

== Technology ==
- Neutral (usually abbreviated "N"), the state where no gears are selected for a motor vehicle's transmission
- Neutral wire, a conductor that provides a low impedance path to earth

== Arts and media ==
- Neutrality (film), a 1949 Spanish drama
- Neutral alignment, a categorization of the moral and ethical perspective of some characters, creatures and societies in some role-playing games
  - Neutral (Dungeons & Dragons), an alignment in the Dungeons & Dragons fantasy role-playing game
- Neutral Records, a record label
- Neutral (Rapper), an American Rapper and hip hop artist

== Other uses ==
- Neutral, Kansas, an unincorporated community in the United States
- Neutral color, a description sometimes used to characterise the color gray

== See also ==
- Impartiality
- Neuter (disambiguation)
- Nutter (disambiguation)
