= PHEX =

Protein-coding gene in the species Homo sapiens

Identifiers
- Aliases: PHEX, HPDR, HPDR1, HYP, HYP1, LXHR, PEX, XLH, phosphate regulating endopeptidase homolog, X-linked, phosphate regulating endopeptidase homolog X-linked
- External IDs: OMIM: 300550; MGI: 107489; GeneCards: PHEX

Gene location (Human)
Chr.	X chromosome (human)
Band	Xp22.11	Start	22,032,325 bp
Band	Xp22.11	End	22,494,713 bp

Gene location (Mouse)
Chr.	X chromosome (mouse)
Band	X F4|X 72.38 cM	Start	155,945,071 bp
Band	X F4|X 72.38 cM	End	156,198,308 bp
RNA expression pattern
Bgee	Human / Mouse (ortholog); Top expressed in: secondary oocyte; tibia; right lung; testicle; jejunal mucosa; upper lobe of left lung; C1 segment; smooth muscle tissue; body of uterus; myometrium / Top expressed in: molar; body of femur; fossa; calvaria; lobe of cerebellum; cumulus cell; left lung lobe; tibiofemoral joint; cerebellar vermis; cochlea; More reference expression data
BioGPS	n/a
Gene ontology
Molecular function	zinc ion binding; peptidase activity; metalloendopeptidase activity; aminopeptidase activity; hydrolase activity; metallopeptidase activity; metal ion binding
Cellular component	perinuclear region of cytoplasm; integral component of membrane; plasma membrane; Golgi apparatus; integral component of plasma membrane; endoplasmic reticulum; membrane
Biological process	organophosphate metabolic process; skeletal system development; cell-cell signaling; bone mineralization; biomineral tissue development; proteolysis; lung development; response to vitamin D; bone development; response to growth hormone; cellular response to vitamin D; cellular response to parathyroid hormone stimulus; response to sodium phosphate; response to insulin-like growth factor stimulus; odontogenesis
Sources:Amigo / QuickGO
Orthologs
Databases	NCBI: entry; OMA: entry
Species	Human	Mouse
Entrez	5251	18675
Ensembl	ENSG00000102174	ENSMUSG00000057457
UniProt	P78562	P70669
RefSeq (mRNA)	NM_000444; NM_001282754	NM_011077
RefSeq (protein)	NP_000435; NP_001269683	NP_035207
Location (UCSC)	Chr X: 22.03 – 22.49 Mb	Chr X: 155.95 – 156.2 Mb
PubMed search
- Wikidata
View/Edit Human	View/Edit Mouse

Phosphate-regulating endopeptidase homolog X-linked also known as phosphate-regulating gene with homologies to endopeptidases on the X chromosome or metalloendopeptidase homolog PEX is an enzyme that in humans is encoded by the PHEX gene. This gene contains 18 exons and is located on the X chromosome.

== Function ==
The protein encoded by this gene is a transmembrane endopeptidase that belongs to the type II integral membrane zinc-dependent endopeptidase family. The protein is thought to be involved in bone and dentin mineralization and renal phosphate reabsorption. The bone and dentin protein osteopontin (OPN) which inhibits mineralization in the skeleton and in teeth is a substrate for PHEX. In the absence of functional PHEX in the mouse model (Hyp) of X-linked hypophosphatemia (XLH), and in human XLH where PHEX activity is decreased or absent, increased circulating FGF23 hormone results in low serum phosphate (caused by renal phosphate wasting) such that there is an insufficient level of this mineral ion in the blood in transit to mineralized tissues compared to the normal amount that is required for proper bone and tooth mineralization; this leads to soft bones and teeth.

In addition to renal phosphate wasting, the mineralization-inhibiting phosphoprotein osteopontin and osteopontin fragments accumulate in the extracellular matrix of bones and teeth to contribute locally to the reduction in mineralization, which together with the systemic lower level of circulating serum phosphate, both lead to the decreased mineralization (hypomineralization) characteristic of the osteomalacia and odontomalacia typically seen in XLH/Hyp. XLH patients have soft and deformed skeletons, and soft teeth that easily become infected. Osteopontin (OPN) is a substrate protein for the enzyme PHEX whose enzymatic activity degrades/removes the mineralization-inhibiting function of OPN in normal mineralized tissue physiology,

In disease, when the PHEX gene is mutated causing reduced or absent PHEX enzymatic activity, OPN that would normally be degraded and cleared remains behind in the extracellular matrix of bones and teeth, accumulating locally in the tissue to contribute to the osteomalacia and odontomalacia. A relationship describing local, physiologic double-negative (inhibiting inhibitors) regulation of mineralization involving OPN has been termed the Stenciling Principle of mineralization, whereby enzyme-substrate pairs imprint mineralization patterns into the extracellular matrix (most notably for bone) by degrading mineralization inhibitors (e.g. TNAP/TNSALP/ALPL enzyme degrading the pyrophosphate inhibition, and PHEX enzyme degrading the osteopontin inhibition). The Stenciling Principle for mineralization is particularly relevant to the osteomalacia and odontomalacia observed in hypophosphatasia and X-linked hypophosphatemia.

== Clinical significance ==
Mutation of PHEX leads to X-linked hypophosphatemia.
