= Fibroblast growth factor 23 =

Protein found in humans

FGF23
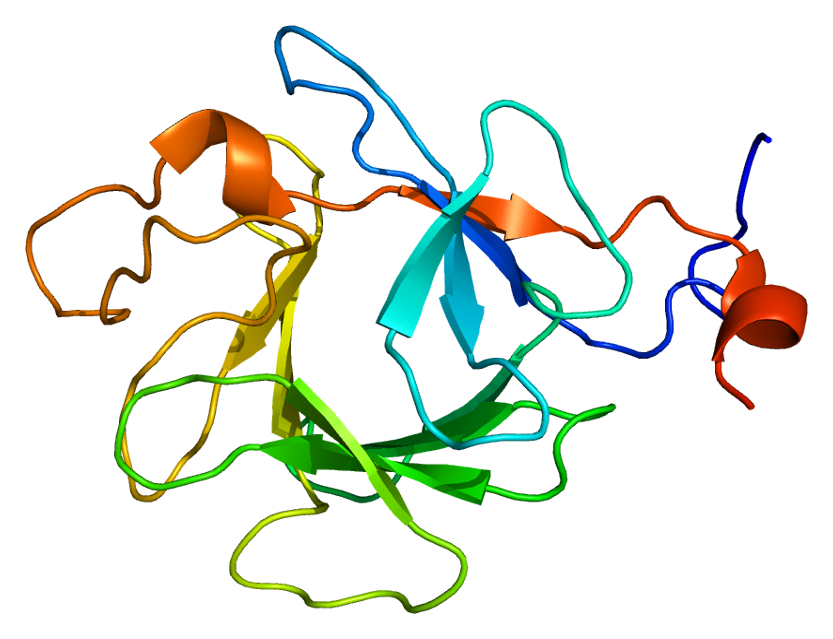

Identifiers
- Aliases: FGF23, ADHR, FGFN, HPDR2, HYPF, PHPTC, fibroblast growth factor 23, HFTC2
- External IDs: OMIM: 605380; MGI: 1891427; GeneCards: FGF23
Available structures
PDB	Ortholog search: PDBe RCSB
PDB	List of PDB id codes 2P39

Gene location (Human)
Chr.	Chromosome 12 (human)
Band	12p13.32	Start	4,368,227 bp
Band	12p13.32	End	4,379,712 bp

Gene location (Mouse)
Chr.	Chromosome 6 (mouse)
Band	6|6 F3	Start	127,049,865 bp
Band	6|6 F3	End	127,058,371 bp
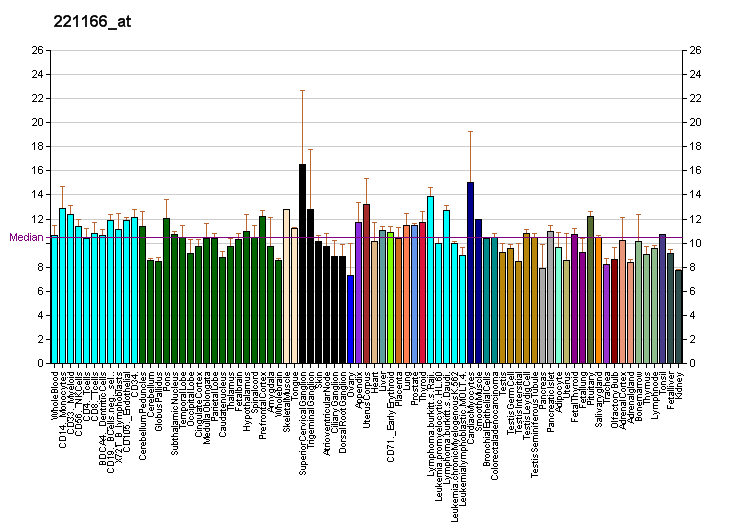
RNA expression pattern
Bgee	Human / Mouse (ortholog); Top expressed in: sural nerve; gonad; testicle; right auricle of heart; liver; right lobe of liver; muscle of thigh; muscle tissue; primary visual cortex; blood / Top expressed in: embryo; lumbar spinal ganglion; zygote; lumbar subsegment of spinal cord; tibiofemoral joint; superior frontal gyrus; extraocular muscle; vastus lateralis muscle; carotid body; major salivary gland; More reference expression data
BioGPS	More reference expression data
Gene ontology
Molecular function	fibroblast growth factor receptor binding; type 1 fibroblast growth factor receptor binding; growth factor activity; protein tyrosine kinase activity; phosphatidylinositol-4,5-bisphosphate 3-kinase activity; 1-phosphatidylinositol-3-kinase activity; protein binding
Cellular component	extracellular region; Golgi lumen; endoplasmic reticulum lumen; extracellular space
Biological process	cell differentiation; negative regulation of bone mineralization; cellular response to interleukin-6; vitamin D metabolic process; regulation of bone mineralization; phosphate ion homeostasis; cellular phosphate ion homeostasis; response to magnesium ion; regulation of phosphate transport; cellular response to vitamin D; negative regulation of osteoblast differentiation; cellular response to leptin stimulus; positive regulation of transcription, DNA-templated; fibroblast growth factor receptor signaling pathway; response to sodium phosphate; positive regulation of ERK1 and ERK2 cascade; positive regulation of vitamin D 24-hydroxylase activity; phosphate-containing compound metabolic process; vitamin D catabolic process; positive regulation of MAPKKK cascade by fibroblast growth factor receptor signaling pathway; cellular response to parathyroid hormone stimulus; negative regulation of hormone secretion; phosphatidylinositol phosphate biosynthetic process; peptidyl-tyrosine phosphorylation; phosphatidylinositol-3-phosphate biosynthetic process; MAPK cascade; post-translational protein modification; regulation of signaling receptor activity; positive regulation of protein kinase B signaling
Sources:Amigo / QuickGO
Orthologs
Databases	NCBI: entry; OMA: entry
Species	Human	Mouse
Entrez	8074	64654
Ensembl	ENSG00000118972	ENSMUSG00000000182
UniProt	Q9GZV9	Q9EPC2
RefSeq (mRNA)	NM_020638	NM_022657
RefSeq (protein)	NP_065689	NP_073148
Location (UCSC)	Chr 12: 4.37 – 4.38 Mb	Chr 6: 127.05 – 127.06 Mb
PubMed search
- Wikidata
View/Edit Human	View/Edit Mouse

Fibroblast growth factor 23 (FGF-23) is a protein and member of the fibroblast growth factor (FGF) family which participates in the regulation of phosphate in plasma and vitamin D metabolism. In humans it is encoded by the FGF23 gene. FGF-23 decreases reabsorption of phosphate in the kidney. Mutations in FGF23 can lead to its increased activity, resulting in autosomal dominant hypophosphatemic rickets.

== Description ==
Fibroblast growth factor 23 (FGF23) is a 251 amino acid protein which in humans is encoded by the FGF23 gene. FGF23 is a member of the fibroblast growth factor (FGF) family which participates in phosphate and vitamin D metabolism and regulation.

== Function ==
FGF23´s main function is to regulate the phosphate concentration in plasma. It does this by decreasing reabsorption of phosphate in the kidney, which means phosphate is excreted in urine. FGF23 is secreted by osteocytes in response to increased calcitriol and phosphate. FGF23 acts on the kidneys by decreasing the expression of NPT2, a sodium-phosphate cotransporter in the proximal tubule.

FGF23 may also suppress 1-alpha-hydroxylase, reducing its ability to activate vitamin D and subsequently impairing calcium absorption.

== Genetics ==
In humans FGF23 is encoded by the FGF23 gene, which is located on chromosome 12 and is composed of three exons. The gene was identified by its mutations associated with autosomal dominant hypophosphatemic rickets.

== Clinical significance ==
Mutations in FGF23, which render the protein resistant to proteolytic cleavage, lead to its increased activity and to renal phosphate loss, in the human disease autosomal dominant hypophosphatemic rickets.

FGF23 can also be overproduced by some types of tumors, such as the benign mesenchymal neoplasm phosphaturic mesenchymal tumor causing tumor-induced osteomalacia, a paraneoplastic syndrome.

Loss of FGF23 activity is thought to lead to increased phosphate levels and the clinical syndrome of familial tumor calcinosis. Mice lacking either FGF23 or the klotho enzyme age prematurely due to hyperphosphatemia.

Over-expression of FGF23 has been associated with cardiovascular disease in chronic kidney disease including cardiomyocyte hypertrophy, vascular calcification, stroke, and endothelial dysfunction.

FGF23 expression and cleavage is promoted by iron deficiency and inflammation.

FGF23 is associated with at least 7 non-nutritional diseases of hypophosphatemia: aside from autosomal dominant hypophosphatemic rickets, X-linked hypophosphatemia, autosomal recessive hypophosphatemic rickets type 1, 2, and 3, Tumor-induced osteomalacia and Hypophosphatemic rickets with hypercalciuria.

== History ==
Prior to its discovery in 2000, it was hypothesized that a protein existed which performed the functions subsequently shown for FGF23. This putative protein was known as phosphatonin. Several types of effects were described including impairment of sodium dependent phosphate transport in both intestinal and renal brush border membrane vesicles, inhibition of production of calcitriol, stimulation of breakdown of calcitriol, and inhibition of production/secretion of parathyroid hormone.
