= Pseudofracture =

A pseudofracture, also called a Looser zone, is a diagnostic finding in osteomalacia. Pseudofracture also rarely occurs in Paget's disease of bone, hyperparathyroidism, renal osteodystrophy, osteogenesis imperfecta, fibrous dysplasia, and hypophosphatasia. Looser zones are named after Emil Looser, a Swiss physician.

== Structure ==
A band of bone material of decreased density may form alongside the surface of the bone. Thickening of the periosteum occurs. The formation of callouses in the affected area is also common. This gives the appearance of a false fracture. Typical sites of involvement are the axillary margins of the scapula, ribs, pubic rami, proximal ends of the femur and ulna.
