= Bone pain =

Feeling that originates in bone

Bone pain (also known medically by several other names) is pain coming from a bone, and is caused by damaging stimuli. It occurs as a result of a wide range of diseases or physical conditions or both, and may severely impair the quality of life.

Bone pain belongs to the class of deep somatic pain, often experienced as a dull pain that cannot be localized accurately by the patient. This is in contrast with the pain which is mediated by superficial receptors in, e.g., the skin. Bone pain can have several possible causes ranging from extensive physical stress to serious diseases such as cancer.

Bones contain nerves. The periosteal layer (an outer membrane) of bone tissue is highly pain-sensitive and an important source of pain in several disease conditions causing bone pain, like fractures, osteoarthritis, etc. However, in certain diseases, the endosteal and haversian nerve supply seems to play an important role, e.g. in osteomalacia, osteonecrosis, and other bone diseases. Thus, there are several types of bone pain, each with many potential sources or origins of cause.

== Causes ==
A number of diseases can cause bone pain, including the following:

- Endocrine, such as hyperparathyroidism, osteoporosis, kidney failure.
- Gastrointestinal or systemic, such as celiac disease and non-celiac gluten sensitivity (both often occur without obvious digestive symptoms), inflammatory bowel disease (including Crohn's disease and ulcerative colitis).
- Hematologic, such as Cushing's syndrome, histiocytosis, multiple myeloma and sickle cell anaemia.
- Infectious, such as Lyme disease and osteomyelitis.
- Neurological, such as spinal cord injury and vertebral degeneration.
- Oncologic, such as bone metastasis, oncogenic osteomalacia and leukemia.
- Rheumatic, such as ankylosing spondylitis, rheumatoid arthritis, gout.
- Others, such as fractures, osteoarthritis, Paget's disease of bone (also termed osteitis deformans or just Paget's disease).

=== Causes in children ===
- Acute leukemia
- Acute rheumatic fever, a very dangerous disease that can cause permanent cardiac damage
- Untreated celiac disease, which can present without gastrointestinal symptoms
- Fibromyalgia, which affects people of all ages
- Growing pains
- Hypermobility syndrome can present with knee or ankle pain
- Lupus
- Henoch–Schönlein purpura
- Fibrous dysplasia of bone
- Infection
- Injury such as a fracture
- Inflammatory bowel disease
- Juvenile idiopathic arthritis
- Legg–Calvé–Perthes disease
- Lyme disease, which is transmitted by ticks and is characterized by debilitating polyarthritis, neurologic symptoms, and erythema migrans
- Lymphoma
- Osteomalacia/rickets in adolescents
- Osteopetrosis
- Osteosarcoma
- Rickets
- Septic arthritis, a severe infection of the joint that can lead to permanent joint damage
- Spondyloarthropathies
- Viral diseases, including the measles, influenza, mononucleosis, chickenpox, and mumps.

Common causes of bone and joint pain in adults, such as osteoarthritis and gouty arthritis are rare in children, as these diseases are a sequelae of chronic wear and tear for several years.

=== Cancer ===
Pain caused by bone cancer is among the worst forms of pain. Because of its severity and uniqueness compared to other forms of pain, it has been researched extensively. From studies of bone cancer in mouse femur models, it has been determined that bone cancer pain results from destruction of bone tissue. Chemical changes within the spinal cord as a result give further insight into the mechanism of bone pain.

Metastatic cancer cells often establish themselves in the skeleton. When the cancer cells have metastasized, the mechanical dynamics of the bone matrix become weaker as skeletal strength decreases. This leads to several complications throughout the body, including pain, thus decreasing the patient's quality of life.

Bone tumors are a conglomeration of cell types, including cancer and immune system cells. Often, tumor cells secrete growth factors that activate receptors close to primary afferent neurons. Activation of these neural receptors is a contributing factor to pain. Also, inflammatory lipids called prostaglandins, which are produced at high rates by cancer cells within tumors, activate nociceptors when they bind together.

== Pathophysiology ==
Stimulation of specialized pain-sensitive nerve fibers (nociceptors) that innervate bone tissue leads to the sensation of bone pain. Bone pain originates from both the periosteum and the bone marrow which relay nociceptive signals to the brain creating the sensation of pain. Bone tissue is innervated by both myelinated (A beta and A delta fiber) and unmyelinated (C fiber) sensory neurons. In combination, they can provide an initial burst of pain, initiated by the faster myelinated fibers, followed by a slower and longer-lasting dull pain initiated by unmyelinated fibers.

Nociceptors responsible for bone pain can be activated via several mechanisms including deterioration of surrounding tissue, bone destruction, and physical stress which shears the bone, vascular, muscle, and nervous tissue.

== Treatment ==
The use of anesthetics within the bone has been a common treatment for several years. This method provides a direct approach using analgesics to relieve pain.

Another commonly used treatment is radiotherapy, which can be safely administered in low doses. Radiotherapy uses radioactive isotopes and other atomic particles to damage the DNA in cells, leading to cell death. By targeting cancer tumors, radiotherapy can decrease tumor size and even destroy the tumor. A form of radiotherapy often used in bone cancer is systemic radioisotope therapy, where the radioisotopes target sections of the bone specifically undergoing metastasis.

In bone fractures, surgical treatment is generally the most effective. Analgesics can be used with surgery to help ease pain of damaged bone.

== Research ==
Mice and other animal models are being heavily used to determine the neuron tissue densities in bone and mechanisms for maintenance of bone pain. This information is pertinent to determining the biological and physiological components of pain in the bone. By creating a detailed map relating the types of nerves going through the different sections of bone, it is possible to pin-point locations in the bone that are at a higher risk of being susceptible to bone pain.

Treatments focusing on biological components such as cannabinoid receptors are being tested for effectiveness. Through testing in mouse models, it has been shown that activation of the CB-1 receptor helps reduce reactions associated with acute pain, indicating that it alleviates bone pain. Thus, a new target for potential treatments is activation of the CB-1 receptor.

Modern research and techniques are attempting to provide longer-lasting and more effective methods of treating bone pain by developing and applying new physiological knowledge of nervous tissue within the bone. If thorough understanding of the intra-neuronal mechanisms relating to pain can be developed, then new and more effective treatment options can be created and tested. Thus, it is critical to fully understand the mechanism which dictates bone pain.

== Names ==
Bone pain is also known by the following names:

Name	Pronunciation	Derivation
ostalgia	/ɒstˈældʒə/	ost- + -algia
ostealgia	/ɒstiˈældʒə/	oste- + -algia
osteodynia	/ɒstioʊˈdɪniə/	oste- + -odynia
