= United Coalition for Animals =

Non-profit organization

United Coalition for Animals (UCAN) is a 501(c)(3) non-profit organization founded in 2001 with the purpose of providing spay/neuter as a solution to pet overpopulation. UCAN made the decision in 2005 to open a Cincinnati-based spay/neuter clinic with the purpose of offering spay/neuter surgeries to low-income communities in the 12-county Greater Cincinnati region.In April of 2007, after thousands of volunteer hours along with a successful capital campaign, UCAN opened its non-profit Spay Neuter Clinic in Cincinnati's Queensgate area. Since that date, the clinic has provided over 67,000 spay/neuter surgeries.

UCAN has the advantage of following the proven model of the Humane Alliance Spay/Neuter Clinic founded in Asheville, North Carolina. One of the most successful programs in the country, Humane Alliance has reduced the euthanasia rate in greater Asheville by more than 82% in the last decade. Furthermore, they are committed to sharing their expertise by helping other clinics get started.

Humane Alliance has partnered with PetSmart Charities and the Humane Society of the United States to form the National Spay Neuter Response Team (NSNRT). NSNRT is a strategic training program designed to assist organizations as they open and operate high-volume, targeted, affordable, spay/neuter clinics across the nation. UCAN has been accepted into the NSNRT program and receives guidance from this team.
