= Osteodystrophy =

Dystrophic growth of the bone

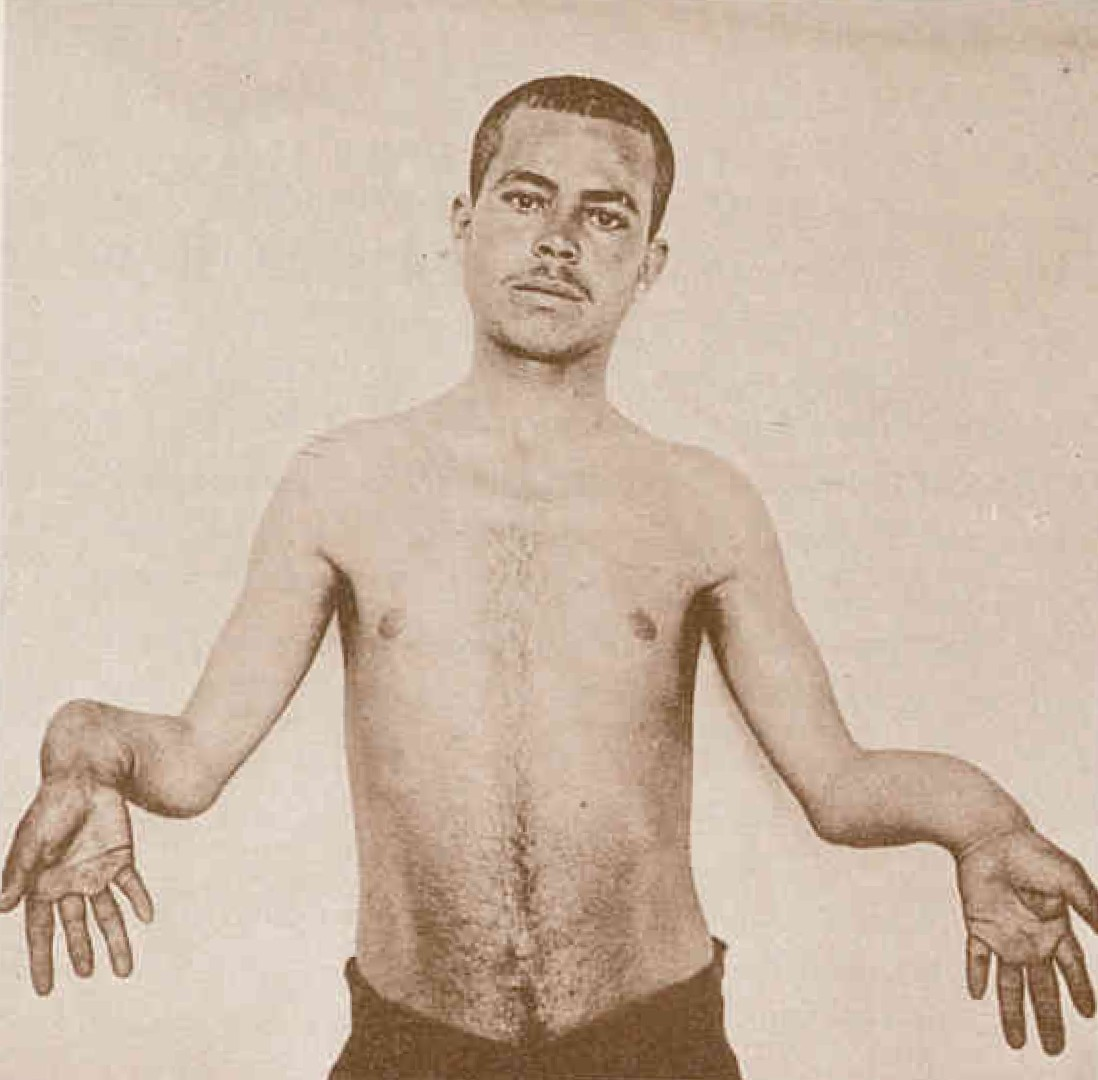
- Osteodystrophy before a chirurgical intervention (Nouvelle iconographie de la Salpêtrière, 1904).
- Specialty: Medical genetics
- Causes: hyperphosphatemia

Osteodystrophy is any dystrophic growth of the bone. It is defective bone development that is usually attributable to renal disease or to disturbances in calcium and phosphorus metabolism.

One form is renal osteodystrophy.

== See also ==
- List of radiographic findings associated with cutaneous conditions
