= Nephropathic cystinosis =

Medical: rare diseases, nephrology,

Nephropathic Cystinosis is a type of a rare kidney disease of the lysosomal storage disorder type. It is genetically inheritable in the autosomal recessive fashion via CTNS (gene). It characterized by systemic accumulation of the amino acid cystine within lysosomes, proximal tubulopathy and by progressive chronic kidney disease. If untreated, it leads to progressive cellular dysfunction and multiorgan involvement. The disease most commonly presents in infancy with renal Fanconi syndrome and, without treatment, progresses to end-stage kidney disease (ESKD) in childhood. Extra-renal manifestations affecting the eyes, thyroid, muscle, pancreas, and central nervous system may develop later in life. Early diagnosis and lifelong cystine-depleting therapy improve growth, delay progression to ESKD, and reduce many systemic complications. Nevertheless, despite treatment, the mean age at death for individuals born between 1985 and 1999 has been 29 years.

== Classification ==
The classification is as follows:

- Infantile (classic) nephropathic cystinosis: the most common and severe form, presenting within the first year of life with Fanconi syndrome and rapid progression to renal failure.
- Juvenile (intermediate) cystinosis: later onset and slower progression.
- Ocular (non-nephropathic or adult) cystinosis: primarily limited to the eyes with minimal or no renal involvement.

== Presentation ==
Presentation in the first 6–12 months with poor growth, polyuria, polydipsia, dehydration, and rickets secondary to proximal renal tubular dysfunction (Fanconi syndrome) causing urinary wasting of glucose, amino acids, bicarbonate, phosphate, and electrolytes. Progressive glomerular damage leading to chronic kidney disease and eventually to kidney failure typically in the first decade, if untreated.

=== Complications ===
These complications often develop despite renal replacement therapy:

Ocular: corneal cystine crystal deposition causes photophobia, eye irritation, and decreased corneal sensitivity; crystals are visible on slit-lamp examination.

Endocrine: hypothyroidism is common; growth hormone deficiency and diabetes mellitus may occur later.

Muscular: Myopathy and swallowing difficulties from progressive proximal muscle weakness and distal involvement in adults.

Neurologic: speech delay, cognitive impairment, and ataxia may appear in older children and adults.

Other: hepatomegaly, pancreatitis, and gonadal dysfunction have been reported.

== Pathophysiology ==
Nephropathic cystinosis is caused by pathogenic variants in the CTNS gene (encoding cystinosin), located in region p13 on chromosome 17, which encodes a lysosomal membrane protein required for cystine transport out of lysosomes. Loss of cystinosin function leads to intralysosomal accumulation of cystine crystals in lysosomes, which cause cellular dysfunction and apoptosis through mechanisms, that include oxidative stress and impaired autophagy. The degree of residual cystinosin function correlates with disease severity, accounting for the spectrum from classic infantile to milder forms.

== Diagnosis ==
Clinical suspicion:

Infants with Fanconi syndrome and failure to thrive; ophthalmologic findings (corneal crystals) support the diagnosis.

Measurement of leukocyte cystine levels: the diagnostic biochemical test is elevated cystine concentration in isolated white blood cells (leukocytes).

Genetic testing: molecular analysis of CTNS confirms the diagnosis and allows for carrier testing and prenatal diagnosis.

Additional testing: renal function and tubular markers, slit-lamp eye exam, thyroid function tests, and assessments for other systemic complications.

== Management ==
Current management aims to deplete intracellular cystine, treat renal tubular losses, preserve kidney function, and address systemic complications.

Cysteamine therapy: Cysteamine (cysteamine bitartrate) is the only specific disease-modifying therapy. It enters lysosomes and reacts with cystine to form cysteine–cysteamine mixed disulfides that can exit the lysosome via alternative transporters, thereby lowering intralysosomal cystine. Oral cysteamine, started early and given lifelong, markedly reduces leukocyte cystine levels, delays progression to ESKD, and decreases some systemic complications. Both immediate-release and delayed-release formulations are used; adherence and dose optimization are critical. Oral cysteamine therapy has extended the time to kidney failure by approximately 7 years (to a mean of 16 years) and mitigates or prevents late complications of the disease. In addition, cysteamine eyedrops can dissolve corneal cystine crystals within months.

Supportive renal care: replacement of bicarbonate, phosphate, potassium, vitamin D and other supplements to manage Fanconi syndrome; growth monitoring and, when indicated, growth hormone therapy.

Kidney transplantation: ESKD is managed with renal transplantation when necessary; however, transplantation does not correct systemic cystine accumulation, so cysteamine therapy should be continued after transplant.

Ocular treatment: topical cysteamine eye drops reduce corneal crystal burden and symptoms.

Multidisciplinary follow-up: regular monitoring by nephrology, ophthalmology, endocrinology, neurology, nutrition, and other specialties is recommended to manage complications and optimize quality of life.

== Prognosis ==
Before the invention of cysteamine treatment in the 1970's, most children with classic nephropathic cystinosis reached end-stage chronic kidney disease (ESKD) by 10–12 years of age. With early and continuous cysteamine therapy and modern supportive care, renal survival has improved substantially and many patients survive into adulthood, although they remain at risk for extra-renal complications that affect morbidity.

Nevertheless, since cysteamine does not cure, but only slows down the disease progression, in many cases, the first kidney transplant in childhood/adolescence has to be followed by a second kidney transplant only 5–15 years later.

== Epidemiology ==
Cystinosis is rare, with estimated incidence of approximately 1 in 100,000–200,000 live births, although prevalence varies by population and may be higher in certain communities due to the founder effect.

In the UK the prevalence of nephropathic cystinosis in children under the age of 16 years was 55 per million (pmp) and the incidence 7.92 pmp. The incidence and prevalence for South Asian were 3 times that of the White and Black populations.

== History ==
Cystinosis was first described in the early 20th century by cystine crystal identification in tissues. The CTNS gene was identified in the late 1990s, enabling genetic diagnosis and improved understanding of pathogenesis.

== Research ==
Current research focuses on better formulations of cysteamine with improved tolerability and dosing schedules, gene therapy approaches to restore CTNS function, and therapies targeting downstream pathways (oxidative stress, autophagy) to prevent tissue damage.
