= Sodium/phosphate cotransporter =

Type of protein

The sodium/phosphate cotransporter is a member of the phosphate:Na^{+} symporter (PNaS) family within the TOG Superfamily of transport proteins as specified in the Transporter Classification Database (TCDB).

== Nomenclature ==
Sodium/phosphate cotransporters are also known as:

- Na^{+}-P_{i} cotransport proteins (NaPi-2a)
- Sodium-dependent phosphate transporters
- Sodium-dependent phosphate symporters
- Phosphate:Na^{+} symporters

== PNaS family ==
The Phosphate:Na^{+} Symporter (PNaS) family (TC# 2.A.58) includes several closely related, functionally characterized, sodium-dependent, inorganic phosphate (Pi) transporter (NPT) proteins from mammals. Other organisms that possess PNaS family members include many in eukaryotic, bacterial and archaeal phyla. Bacterial sodium:phosphate symporters, NptA of Vibrio cholerae (TC#2.A.58.1.2) and YjbB of E. coli (TC# 2.A.58.2.1) have been functionally characterized.

The well-characterized mammalian proteins are found in renal (IIa isoform) and intestinal (IIb isoform) brush border membranes and are about 640 amino acyl residues long with 8-12 putative TMSs. The N- and C-termini both reside in the cytoplasm, and a large hydrophilic loop is localized between trans-membrane segments (TMSs) 3 and 4. While IIa isoforms are pH-dependent, IIb isoforms are pH-independent. The IIa sodium phosphate symporter isoform is a functional monomer, but it interacts with PDZ proteins which probably mediate apical sorting, parathyroid hormone-controlled endocytosis and/or lysosomal sorting of internalized transporters.

=== Transport reaction ===
The transport reaction catalyzed by the mammalian proteins is:

P_{i} (out) + 3 Na^{+} (out) ⇌ P_{i} (in) + 3 Na^{+} (in).

== Human PNaS proteins ==
There are several known sodium-dependent phosphate transporters found in humans. For example, the protein 2A is encoded by the solute carrier family 34, member 1 (SLC34A1) gene and facilitates uptake of phosphate for normal cellular functions including cellular metabolism, signal transduction, and nucleic acid and lipid synthesis. The PNaS family is also called the SLC34 family.

Other known sodium-dependent phosphate transporters found in humans include (but are not limited to):

- Sodium-Phosphate Cotransporter Proteins, Type I (TC# 2.A.1.14):
  - SLC17A1 (NPT1)
  - SLC17A2 (NPT3)
  - SLC17A3 (NPT4)
  - SLC17A4
- Sodium-Phosphate Cotransporter Proteins, Type II (TC# 2.A.58):
  - SLC34A1 (NPTIIa)
  - SLC34A2 (NPTIIb), codes for sodium-dependent phosphate transport protein 2b (NaPi2b), a tumor-associated antigen.
  - SLC34A3 (NPTIIc)
- Sodium-Phosphate Cotransporter Proteins, Type III (TC# 2.A.20):
  - SLC20A1 (PIT1)
  - SLC20A2 (PIT2)

== PNaS Proteins in Other Groups ==
=== Teleost Fish ===
Due to the Actinopterygian whole genome duplication event, slc34a1 and slc34a2 are present in a duplicated form in many teleost fish - slc34a1a and slc34a1b, slc34a2a and slc34a2b. This is not uniform and slc341b is frequently lost in some Actinopterygian lineages. slc34a3-type genes are not present.

== Antibody ==
Lifastuzumab vedotin is a monoclonal antibody for the sodium/phosphate cotransporter that is under development for the treatment of cancer.

== See also ==
- Cotransporter
- Co-transport
- P-loop
- Renal physiology
- Symport
- Symporter
- Solute carrier family
- Transporter Classification Database
