= TOG superfamily =

Protein superfamily

The transporter-opsin-G protein-coupled receptor (TOG) superfamily is a protein superfamily of integral membrane proteins, usually of 7 or 8 transmembrane alpha-helical segments (TMSs). It includes (1) ion-translocating microbial rhodopsins, (2) G protein-coupled receptors (GPCRs), (3) sweet sugar transporters, (4) nicotinamide ribonucleoside uptake permeases (PnuCs; TC# 4.B.1), (5) 4-toluene sulfonate uptake permeases (TSUPs; TC# 2.A.102), (6) Ni^{2+}–Co^{2+} transporters; (NiCoTs; TC# 2.A.52), (7) organic solute transporters (OSTs; TC# 2.A.82), (8) phosphate:Na^{+} symporters (PNaS; TC# 2.A.58), and (9) lysosomal cystine transporters (LCTs; TC# 2.A.43).

== Families ==
Currently recognized families within the TOG Superfamily (with TC numbers in blue) include:

- 1.A.14 - The Testis-enhanced Gene Transfer (TEGT) Family
- 1.A.26 - The Mg^{2+} Transporter-E (MgtE) Family
- 1.A.76 - The Magnesium Transporter1 (MagT1) Family
- 2.A.43 - The Lysosomal Cystine Transporter (LCT) Family
- 2.A.52 - The Ni^{2+}-Co^{2+} Transporter (NiCoT) Family
- 2.A.58 - The Phosphate:Na^{+} Symporter (PNaS) Family
- 2.A.82 - The Organic Solute Transporter (OST) Family
- 2.A.102 - The 4-Toluene Sulfonate Uptake Permease (TSUP) Family
- 2.A.123 - The Sweet; PQ-loop; Saliva; MtN3 (Sweet) Family
- 3.E.1 - The Ion-translocating Microbial Rhodopsin (MR) Family
- 4.B.1 - The Nicotinamide Ribonucleoside (NR) Uptake Permease (PnuC) Family
- 9.A.14 - The G-protein-coupled receptor (GPCR) Family

== Structures ==
A couple of the 3-D structures available for members of the following families include:

- SWEET family: 4RNG
- MR family: 5AX0, 3T45 - high resolution structures
- PnuC family: 4QTN
- GPCR family: 3CAP

== See also ==
- Solute carrier family
- Transporter Classification Database
