= Lysosomal cystine transporter family =

Family of proteins, including secondary proteins from Eukaryotes, part of TOG Superfamily

The Lysosomal Cystine Transporter (LCT) family (TC# 2.A.43) is part of the TOG Superfamily and includes secondary transport proteins that are derived from animals, plants, fungi and other eukaryotes. They exhibit 7 putative transmembrane α-helical spanners (TMSs) and vary in size between about 200 and 500 amino acyl residues, although most have between 300 and 400 residues.

These proteins are found in intracellular organelles of eukaryotes, many in lysosomes. The few that have been characterized transport Cystine (TC# 2.A.43.1.1), basic amino acids such as L-lysine and L-arginine (TC# 2.A.43.2.1) and drugs such as fluconazole and caspofungin (TC# 2.A.43.2.7).

== Cystinosin ==
A protein mutated in the rare human genetic disease, nephropathic intermediate cystinosis, also called cystinosin (TC# 2.A.43.1.1), is encoded by the CTNS gene. In cystinotic renal proximal tubules (RPTs), diminished cystinosin function appears to result in reduced reabsorption of solutes by other secondary transporters such as the Na^{+}/Phosphate cotransporter, due to decreased expression of these other transport proteins.

=== Function ===
Evidence suggests that cystinosin transports cystine out of lysosomes in a pmf-dependent process. The proton motive force (pmf) across the lysosomal membrane is generated by a V-type ATPase which hydrolyzes cytoplasmic ATP to pump protons into the lysosomal lumen. Removal of the C-terminal GYDQL lysosomal sorting motif causes cystinosin to migrate to the plasma membrane with the intralysosomal face of cystinosin facing the extracellular medium. The cells then take up cystine in a pmf-dependent process.

=== Homologues ===
Distant homologues include the Lec15/Lec35 suppressor, SL15, of Chinese hamster ovary cells and ERS1, the ERD suppressor in S. cerevisiae. Both of these suppressors, when overexpressed, have been reported to influence retention of lumenal endoplasmic reticular proteins as well as glycosylation in the Golgi apparatus. The Lec15 and Lec35 mutations are characterized by inefficient synthesis and utilization, respectively, of mannose-P-dolichol for glycolipid biosynthesis. All proteins in the LCT family are distantly related to the proteins of the microbial rhodopsin (MR) family (TC #3.E.1), an established member of the TOG Superfamily, which exhibit a 7 TMS topology.

==== Reaction ====
The reaction believed to be catalyzed by cystinosin is:

Cystine (intralysosomal space) + H^{+} (intralysosomal space) → Cystine (cytoplasm) + H^{+} (cytoplasm)
