= CTNS =

CTNS may refer to:

- Center for Theology and the Natural Sciences, a research center of the Graduate Theological Union
- CTNS (gene)
