= Metal–organic biohybrid =

Type of material

Metal–organic biohybrids (MOBs) are a family of materials containing a metal component, such as copper, and a biological component, such as the amino acid dimer cystine. One of the MOB families first described was the copper-high aspect ratio structure called CuHARS. Scanning electron microscopy (SEM) and transmission electron microscopy (TEM) of CuHARS revealed linear morphology and smooth surface texture. SEM, TEM and light microscopy showed that CuHARS composites had scalable dimensions from nano- to micro-, with diameters as low as 40 nm, lengths exceeding 150 microns, and average aspect ratios of 100.

== Structure ==
MOBs are composed of two major components: a metal ion or cluster of metal ions and a biological molecule. Examples are:

- CuHARS which contain copper as the metal ion and cystine as the biological molecule
- The use of silver as the metal ion in combination with cystine. Cystine is the dimer form of the amino acid cysteine. Cobalt has also been used in combination with cystine to form CoMOBs.

When combined with copper to form CuHARS, the cystine may provide a linker function leading to a linear, high-aspect ratio structure that gives CuHARS its name: copper high-aspect ratio structures. In contrast to CuHARS, MOBs formed with silver and cystine result in silver nanoparticles with spherical, rounded structure. These have been named AgCysNPs.

Figure 1 shows comparative electron microscopy of CuHARS and AgCysNPs.

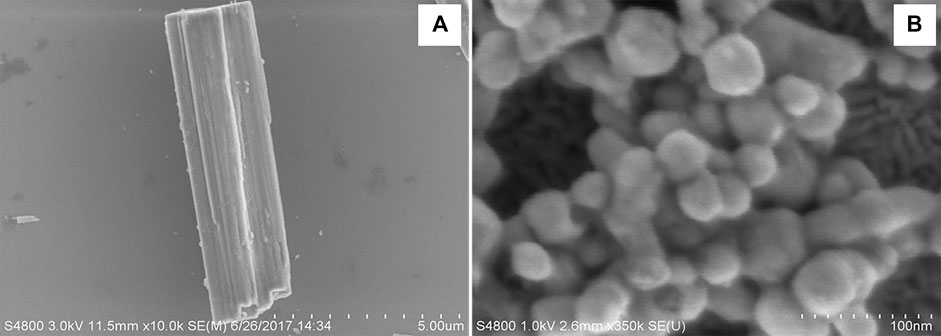
Figure 1: Linear CuHARS (A) and AgCysNPs (B) are shown using scanning electron microscopy.

=== Synthesis ===
MOBs under reducing conditions using sodium hydroxide (NaOH) can be self-assembled at body temperature (37 degrees Celsius). In the case of copper CuHARS, MOBs can be produced by transforming copper nanoparticles to provide the copper source or using copper(II) sulfate.

== Variants of MOBs ==
Since the discovery of MOBs there have been four published variants: Copper High Aspect Ratio Structures (CuHARS), Silver Cystine Nanoparticles (CysAg NPs), Cobalt Nanoparticles (CoMOBs), and Selenocystine Copper MOBs (SeMOBs).

=== CuHARS ===
CuHARS as described above are a combination of copper sulfate or copper oxide nano particles in the presence of cystine dissolved in sodium hydroxide.

=== Silver Cystine Nanoparticles ===
Silver Cystine Nanoparticles (CysAgNPs) are a subvariant of MOB that replaces the copper sulfate pentahydrate in solution with silver ions.

=== Cobalt Nanoparticles ===
Cobalt Nanoparticles (CoMOBs) are a subvariant of MOBs where the copper sulfate pentahydrate has been replaced by cobalt sulfate hexahydrate.

=== Selenocystine Copper MOBs ===
Selenocystine Copper MOBs (SeMOBs) are a subvariant of MOB where the cystine has been substituted for the 21st amino acid of selenocystine. The resulting MOB has both nanoparticle and HARS forms.

== Physical characteristics ==
CuHARS have been shown to completely degrade under physiological conditions (cell culture media at 37 °C), even in the absence of cells; this is possibly due to the metal chelating properties of typical cell culture medias. These may include the copper-binding properties of cerulosplasmin and of albumin. Additionally, CuHARS have been shown to polarize light using inverted microscopy. Cobalt-containing MOBs (CoMOBs) have been shown to be susceptible to an externally applied magnetic field as shown in Figure 2.

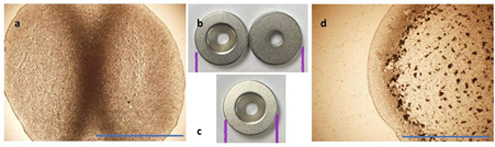
Figure 2. Magnetic susceptibility of CoMOBs. Cobalt and copper containing MOBs were synthesized and exposed to a magnetic field

=== Uses and applications ===
MOBs have been incorporated into composites including cellulose. Additionally, MOBs composed of the copper-containing CuHARS have been shown to provide catalytic function to produce nitric oxide (NO).

=== Nitric oxide production ===
This production of NO was shown to impart anti-microbial activity, and the CuHARS in this case were incorporated into a biodegradable, biocompatible, and renewable resource material, namely cellulose. The release of NO catalyzed by copper from CuHARS may have beneficial biomedical applications.

=== Anti-cancer effects ===
Both copper- and silver-containing MOBs were shown to have anti-cancer effect on cells in vitro. In the case of possible uses for CuHARS, copper may have a potential role in tumor immunity and for antitumor therapy. Since CuHARS are 100% biodegradable under physiological conditions, copper metabolism of CuHARS may have benefits as an approach for treating glioma.

=== MOBs as green materials using self-assembly ===
Green nanomedicine has been suggested as a path to the next generation of materials for diagnosing brain tumors and for therapeutics, including the use of CuHARS.

=== Angiogenic effects ===
CuHARS embedded into nanofiber aerogels have been shown to have angiogenic effects.

=== Antibacterial effects ===
CuHARS embedded into nanofiber aerogels and via CuHARS-mediated nitric oxide generation have both been examples of antibacterial effects.

== Discoveries of published MOBs ==
Throughout the years of 2014 to current, several MOBs have been discovered. Different teams of researching undergraduates, graduate students and other researchers have operated to uncover new formations. Note this list is incomplete of all materials, as the aim is to only document the individuals responsible for original successful synthesis of materials, along with their time periods and works that debuted the materials. For works that first appeared in non-peer-reviewed sources, the primary source along with the first peer reviewed source will be presented.

MOB	Date of original synthesis	Team	Source
CuHARS	2014	Kelly Cotton Jessica Wasserman Sneha Deodhar Justin Huckaby Mark DeCoster	
AgCysNps	2018	Mark DeCoster	
CoMOBs	2018	Mark DeCoster	
SeMOBs	Summer 2025	Kyle Rugg Jenna Etheridge Caitlyn Boudreaux Natalie Fairley Mark DeCoster	
