= White lung =

White lung or white lung syndrome may refer to:

- Acute respiratory distress syndrome
- Asbestosis
- Pulmonary alveolar microlithiasis
- Silicosis
- White Lung, a Canadian punk rock group
