= Thioethanolamine S-acetyltransferase =

Identifiers
- EC no.: 2.3.1.11
- CAS no.: 9029-93-0

Databases
- IntEnz: IntEnz view
- BRENDA: BRENDA entry
- ExPASy: NiceZyme view
- KEGG: KEGG entry
- MetaCyc: metabolic pathway
- PRIAM: profile
- PDB structures: RCSB PDB PDBe PDBsum
- Gene Ontology: AmiGO / QuickGO
Search
- PMC: articles
- PubMed: articles
- NCBI: proteins

Thioethanolamine S-acetyltransferase (EC 2.3.1.11) is an enzyme that catalyzes the chemical reaction

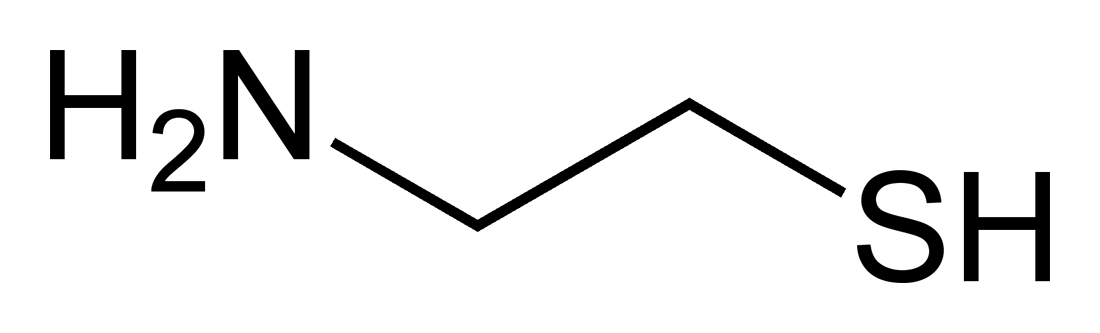
cysteamine
+
acetyl-CoA
S-acetylcysteamine
+ coenzyme A

The two substrates of this enzyme are cysteamine and acetyl-CoA. Its products are S-acetylcysteamine and coenzyme A.

This enzyme belongs to the family of transferases, specifically those acyltransferases transferring groups other than aminoacyl groups. The systematic name of this enzyme class is acetyl-CoA:2-aminoethanethiol S-acetyltransferase. Other names in common use include thioltransacetylase B, thioethanolamine acetyltransferase, and acetyl-CoA:thioethanolamine S-acetyltransferase.
