= Magnesium transporter protein 1 =

Protein found in humans

MAGT1

Identifiers
- Aliases: MAGT1, IAP, MRX95, OST3B, PRO0756, XMEN, bA217H1.1, RP11-217H1.1, magnesium transporter 1, SLC58A1, CDG1CC
- External IDs: OMIM: 300715; MGI: 1914325; GeneCards: MAGT1

Gene location (Human)
Chr.	X chromosome (human)
Band	Xq21.1	Start	77,825,747 bp
Band	Xq21.1	End	77,899,271 bp

Gene location (Mouse)
Chr.	X chromosome (mouse)
Band	X|X D	Start	105,011,690 bp
Band	X|X D	End	105,055,512 bp
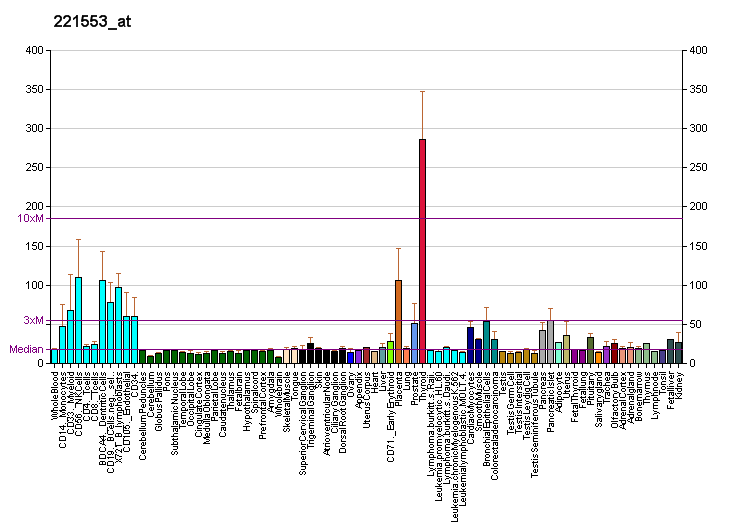
RNA expression pattern
Bgee	Human / Mouse (ortholog); Top expressed in: palpebral conjunctiva; corpus epididymis; tibia; parotid gland; germinal epithelium; pericardium; decidua; visceral pleura; parietal pleura; seminal vesicula / Top expressed in: parotid gland; lacrimal gland; ciliary body; seminal vesicula; Paneth cell; submandibular gland; vestibular sensory epithelium; islet of Langerhans; migratory enteric neural crest cell; iris; More reference expression data
BioGPS	More reference expression data
Gene ontology
Molecular function	magnesium ion transmembrane transporter activity; dolichyl-diphosphooligosaccharide-protein glycotransferase activity
Cellular component	integral component of membrane; oligosaccharyltransferase complex; plasma membrane; integral component of plasma membrane; membrane; endoplasmic reticulum membrane; azurophil granule membrane; endoplasmic reticulum
Biological process	magnesium ion transport; protein N-linked glycosylation; cognition; transmembrane transport; magnesium ion transmembrane transport; neutrophil degranulation; protein glycosylation; protein N-linked glycosylation via asparagine; transport
Sources:Amigo / QuickGO
Orthologs
Databases	NCBI: entry; OMA: entry
Species	Human	Mouse
Entrez	84061	67075
Ensembl	ENSG00000102158	ENSMUSG00000031232
UniProt	Q9H0U3	Q9CQY5
RefSeq (mRNA)	NM_032121; NM_001367916	NM_001190409; NM_025952; NM_001377002; NM_001377003
RefSeq (protein)	NP_115497; NP_001354845	NP_001177338; NP_080228; NP_001363931; NP_001363932
Location (UCSC)	Chr X: 77.83 – 77.9 Mb	Chr X: 105.01 – 105.06 Mb
PubMed search
- Wikidata
View/Edit Human	View/Edit Mouse

Magnesium transporter protein 1 is a protein that in humans is encoded by the MAGT1 gene.

== See also ==
- Magnesium transporter 1 family
