= Nicotinamide ribonucleoside uptake transporters =

Family of transport proteins

Identifiers
- Symbol: PnuC
- Pfam: PF04973
- TCDB: 4.B.1
- OPM superfamily: 377
- OPM protein: 4qtn
Available protein structures:
- PDB: PF04973 (ECOD; PDBsum)
- AlphaFold: PF04973

The Nicotinamide Ribonucleoside (NR) Uptake Permease (PnuC) Family (TC# 4.B.1) is a family of transmembrane transporters that is part of the TOG superfamily. Close PnuC homologues are found in a wide range of Gram-negative and Gram-positive bacteria, archaea and eukaryotes.

== Function ==
PnuC of Salmonella typhimurium and Haemophilus influenzae are believed to function cooperatively with NadR homologues, multifunctional proteins that together with PnuC, participate in NR phosphorylation, transport and transcriptional regulation. NadR, a cytoplasmic protein that is partly membrane associated, contains one well conserved and one poorly conserved mononucleotide-binding consensus sequence (G-X4 GKS). It drives transport and may render transport responsive to internal pyridine nucleotide levels. While its N-terminal half functions as a repressor, its C-terminal half functions as an NR kinase in a putative group translocation process.

=== PnuC of Haemophilus influenzae ===
The H. influenzae homologue has been shown to transport NR from the periplasm into the cytoplasm. Phosphorylation of NR by NadR is required for NR uptake. The ribonucleoside kinase (RNK) domain has both Walker A and Walker B motifs, responsible for ATP binding and phosphoryl transfer. In addition, a proposed LID domain was identified in RNK. LID domains have been found in other kinases, and these domains are regions which are able to move after substrate binding. They are responsible for coordination of three distinct conformations, an open state in the absence of substrate, a partially closed state after substrate binding, and a fully closed state when both substrates are present.

In H. influenzae, NR enters the NAD^{+} resynthesis pathway after phosphorylation to NMN, and subsequently, NAD^{+} is synthesized from NMN and ATP via an NMN adenylyl transferase activity. NadR represents a multifunctional regulator/enzyme complex able to integrate several functions, such as enzymatic catalysis, transport, and transcriptional regulatory activities.

== Other constituents required for uptake ==
The components of the H. influenzae pathway necessary for NAD^{+}, NMN, and NR uptake have been determined. Merdanovic et al. characterized two enzymes, an outer membrane nucleotide phosphatase, and an NAD^{+} nucleotidase (NadN) located in the periplasm. They showed that NAD^{+} and NMN cross the outer membrane mainly via the OmpP2 porin.

Only NR can be utilized by the PnuC transport system located in the inner membrane. The pnuC gene product is the protein that is responsible for the main flow of the NR substrate into the cytoplasm. The study of Merdanovic et al. suggests that the RNK activity of NadR determines NR transport and is negatively regulated by cytoplasmic NAD^{+} feedback inhibition. Therefore, NR uptake is under NadR feedback control.

ATP, not the proton motive force, appears to be required for NR uptake. Thus, the driving force for NR uptake via PnuC is NR phosphorylation by NadR. A concerted group translocation mechanism can be considered whereby NadR facilitates the dissociation of NR from PnuC by phosphorylating it to NMN, thus preventing efflux of NR.

=== Transport reaction ===
The proposed transport reaction catalyzed by PnuC and NadR is:

NR (out) + ATP (in) → NMN (in) + ADP (in).

== Structure ==
PnuC of Salmonella typhimurium and Haemophilus influenzae are integral membrane proteins, 239 and 226 amino acyl residues (aas) in length, respectively, with 7 putative transmembrane α-helical segments.

The structure of NadR has been determined. Mutations in the nadR gene which interfere with NR uptake occur in the C-terminal part of NadR. A helix-turn-helix DNA binding domain present in NadR of S. enterica serovar Typhimurium could not be found in the NadR homologue of H. influenzae. Therefore, it was proposed that in H. influenzae NadR has no regulatory function at the transcriptional level. The structures of the human NR kinase 1 (2QL6_P) with nucleotide and nucleoside substrates bound have been solved. It is structurally similar to Rossmann fold metabolite kinases.

PnuC has been shown to resemble SWEET porters in overall fold, supporting the conclusion that these two families are members of the TOG superfamily.

=== Crystal structures ===
NadR Protein from H. influenzae PDB: 1LW7

NR transporter PnuC PDB: 4QTN
