= SWEET transporters =

SemiSWEET PQ-loop

Identifiers
- Symbol: PQ-loop
- Pfam: PF03083
- Pfam clan: PQ-loop
- InterPro: IPR006603
- SMART: SM00679
- TCDB: 2.A.123
- OPM superfamily: 415
- OPM protein: 5ctg
Available protein structures:
- PDB: IPR006603 PF03083 (ECOD; PDBsum)
- AlphaFold: IPR006603; PF03083

The SWEET family (Sugars Will Eventually Be Exported Transporter), also known as the PQ-loop, Saliva or MtN3 family (TC# 2.A.123), is a family of sugar transporters and a member of the TOG superfamily. The proteins of the SWEET family have been found in plants, animals, protozoans, and bacteria. Eukaryotic family members have 7 transmembrane segments (TMSs) in a 3+1+3 repeat arrangement.

== Function ==
Proteins of the SWEET family appear to catalyze facilitated diffusion (entry or export) of sugars across the plant plasma membrane or the endoplasmic reticulum membrane.

They also seem to transport other metabolites, like gibberellins.

=== Transport Reaction ===
The generalized reaction catalyzed by known proteins of this family is:

sugars (in) ⇌ sugars (out)

== Discovery ==
SWEETs were originally identified in Arabidopsis thaliana, in a screen for novel facilitators of transmembrane glucose transport. In this experiment, several previously uncharacterized membrane proteins were selected to be screened. These uncharacterized membrane proteins were assayed for glucose transport ability by expression in HEK293T (human embryonic kidney) cells, which have negligible glucose transport ability in the normal state. These membrane proteins were co-expressed with a fluorescent FRET (Förster resonance energy transfer) glucose sensor localized to the endoplasmic reticulum (ER). Glucose movement from the cytoplasm to the ER of the HEK293T cells was monitored by quantifying changes in FRET ratio. By using this assay, the first member of the SWEET family, AtSWEET1, was identified. Other potential family members were identified by sequence homology.

== Homologues ==
Chen et al. (2010) reviewed evidence for a new class of sugar transporters, named SWEETs. Those that mediate glucose transport include at least six out of seventeen sugar homologues in Arabidopsis (i.e., TC#s 2.A.123.1.3, 2.A.123.1.5, 2.A.123.1.9, 2.A.123.1.13), two out of over twenty porters in rice (TC#s 2.A.123.1.6 and 2.A.123.1.18), two out of seven homologues in Caenorhabditis elegans (i.e., TC# 2.A.123.1.10) and the single copy human protein (SLC50A1 of Homo sapiens, TC# 2.A.123.1.4). Without Arabidopsis SWEET8 (TC# 2.A.123.1.5), pollen is not viable. The corn homolog ZmSWEET4c was shown to be involved in seed filling.

Currently classified members of the SWEET transporter family can be found in the Transporter Classification Database.

== SWEETs in plants ==
Plant SWEETs fall into four subclades. The tomato genome encodes 29 SWEETs.

=== SWEET9 in Nectar Secretion ===
Lin et al., 2014, examined the role of SWEET9 in nectaries. SWEET9 is a member of clade 3. A homologue in petunias had been shown to have an inverse correlation between expression and starch content in nectaries. Mutation and overexpression of SWEET9 in Arabidopsis led to corresponding loss of and increase in nectar secretion, respectively. After showing that SWEET9 is involved in nectar secretion, the next step was to determine at which phase of the process SWEET9 has its function. The 3 options were: phloem unloading, or uptake or efflux from nectary parenchyma. A combination of localization studies and starch accumulation assays showed that SWEET9 is involved in sucrose efflux from the nectary parenchyma.

=== SWEETs 11, 12, and 15 in Embryo Nutrition ===
Chen et al., 2015, asked what SWEETs are involved in providing nutrition to an embryo. The team noticed that mRNA and protein for SWEETs 11, 12, and 15 are each expressed at high levels during some stage of embryo development. Each gene was subsequently mutated to generate a sweet11;12;15 triple mutant which lacked activity in each of the three genes. This triple mutant was shown to have delayed embryo development; that is, the seeds of the triple mutant were significantly smaller than that of the wild type at the same time during development. The starch content of the seed coat was higher than the wild-type, and the starch content of the embryo was lower than the wild-type. Additionally, protein levels were shown to be maternally controlled: in a sweet11;12;15 mutant crossed with a wild-type plant, the mutant phenotype was only seen when sweet11;12;15 was used as the maternal plant.

== Structure ==
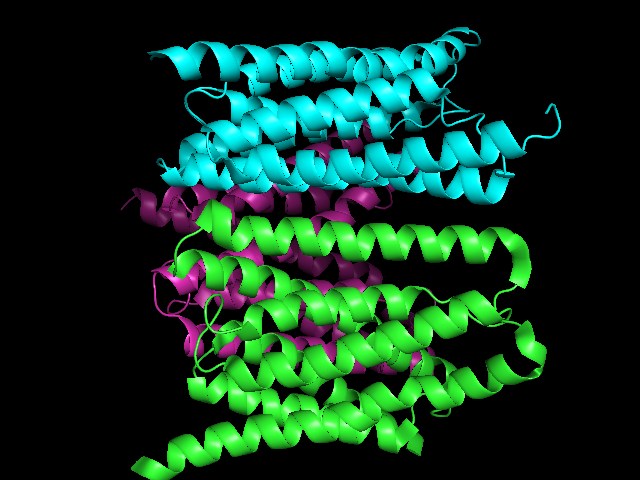
3.1 A resolution structure of a eukaryotic SWEET transporter in a homotrimer (5CTG, OsSWEET2). Each different color represents one subunit.

Many bacterial homologues have only 3 TMSs and are half sized, but they nevertheless are members of the SWEET family with a single 3 TMS repeat unit. Other bacterial homologues have 7 TMSs as do most eukaryotic proteins in this family. The SWEET family is large and diverse. Based on 3-D structural analyses, it is likely that these paired 3 TMS SWEET family members function as carriers.

Bacterial SemiSWEETs, consist of a triple-helix bundle in a 1-3-2 conformation, with TM3 sandwiched between TM1 and TM2. The structures also show tryptophan and asparagine residues interacting with the sugar; point mutations of these residues to alanine destroys the hexose transport function of SemiSWEET. The SWEET family is a member of the TOG superfamily which is believed to have arisen via the pathway:

2 TMSs --> 4 TMSs --> 8 TMSs --> 7 TMSs --> 3 + 3 TMSs.

Several crystal structures are available on RCSB for members of the SWEET/SemiSWEET/PQ-loop/Saliva/MtN3 family.

== See also ==
- Solute carrier family
- TOG Superfamily
- Transporter Classification Database
- Glucose transporter
- Transport protein
