= Familial renal disease in animals =

Familial renal disease is an uncommon cause of kidney failure in dogs and cats. Most causes are breed-related (familial) and some are inherited. Some are congenital (present at birth). Renal dysplasia is a type of familial kidney disease characterized by abnormal cellular differentiation of kidney tissue. Dogs and cats with kidney disease caused by these diseases have the typical symptoms of kidney failure, including weight loss, loss of appetite, depression, and increased water consumption and urination. A list of familial kidney diseases by dog and cat breeds is found below.

== Familial renal disease in dogs ==
=== Basenji ===
Basenjis can be affected by a type of kidney tubular dysfunction similar to that of Fanconi syndrome in humans.

=== Beagle ===
Beagles can be affected by glomerular amyloidosis, which is deposition of amyloid in the kidney. Findings include protein in the urine. It does progress.

=== Bull Terrier ===
Bull Terriers can be affected by an inherited type of kidney disease caused by basement membrane disease. Protein in the urine is a consistent finding. Bull Terriers are affected between the ages of one and eight years.

=== Cairn Terrier ===
Cairn Terriers can be affected by polycystic kidney disease. Multiple small cysts are found in the kidneys. Cysts are present by the age of six weeks. It is inherited through an autosomal recessive mechanism.

=== Chow Chow ===
Chow Chows can be affected by renal dysplasia that progresses to kidney failure and secondary fibrous renal osteodystrophy, causing fractures and "rubber jaw".

=== Cocker Spaniel ===
Cocker Spaniels can be affected by glomerular disease before the age of four years. It does progress to kidney failure. It is inherited as an autosomal recessive trait.

=== Doberman Pinscher ===
Doberman Pinschers can be affected by basement membrane disease of the kidneys that can progress to kidney failure.

=== German Shepherd ===
German Shepherd dogs can be affected by multiple cystadenocarcinomas of the kidney. It is inherited and appears between the ages of five and 11 years. Blood in the urine is often seen. It is sometimes accompanied by nodules in the skin or multiple uterine leiomyomas.

=== Lhasa Apso and Shih Tzu ===
Lhasa Apsos and Shih Tzus can both be affected by renal dysplasia before the age of five years. It does progress to kidney failure. It can be accompanied by fibrous osteodystrophy, caused by calcium absorption from the bone. Signs include bone fractures and "rubber jaw".

=== Miniature Schnauzer ===
Miniature Schnauzers can be affected by renal dysplasia before the age of five years. It does progress to kidney failure.

=== Norwegian Elkhound ===
Norwegian Elkhounds can be affected by kidney tubule disease (Fanconi syndrome) that does not progress to kidney failure. A consistent finding is glucose in the urine.

=== Rottweiler ===
Rottweilers can be affected by glomerular disease before the age of one year that does progress to kidney failure. Findings include protein in the urine and high cholesterol levels in the blood.

=== Samoyed ===
Samoyeds can be affected by basement membrane disease of the kidneys. It is inherited through the X chromosome and is therefore more severe in affected male dogs. Findings in male dogs include the presence of protein and glucose in the urine and the inability to concentrate urine, and progression to kidney failure by the age of 9 months and death by 16 months. Affected female dogs have protein in the urine and a failure to gain a normal amount of weight, but are usually otherwise normal.

=== Shar Pei ===
Shar Peis can be affected by glomerular amyloidosis caused by deposition of amyloid in the kidneys and occurs secondary to Shar Pei fever. It progresses to kidney failure by the age of six years.

=== Shih Tzu ===
Shih Tzus have a type of renal dysplasia characterized by persistence of the fetal glomeruli. The predominating signs are of chronic kidney failure. Severely affected dogs only live for a few months. The mechanism of inheritance appears to be through an autosomal dominant gene with incomplete penetrance.

=== Soft-Coated Wheaten Terrier ===
Soft-Coated Wheaten Terriers can be affected by renal dysplasia that progresses to kidney failure. It is usually seen by the age of three years.

=== Standard Poodle ===
Standard Poodles can be affected by renal dysplasia by the age of two years that progresses to kidney failure. Secondary fibrous osteodystrophy can be seen.

=== Welsh Corgi ===
Welsh Corgis can be affected by kidney telangiectasias between the ages of five and thirteen years. It is characterized by red-black nodules in the kidneys. It can cause hydronephrosis and abdominal pain. It usually does not progress to kidney failure.

== Familial renal disease in cats ==
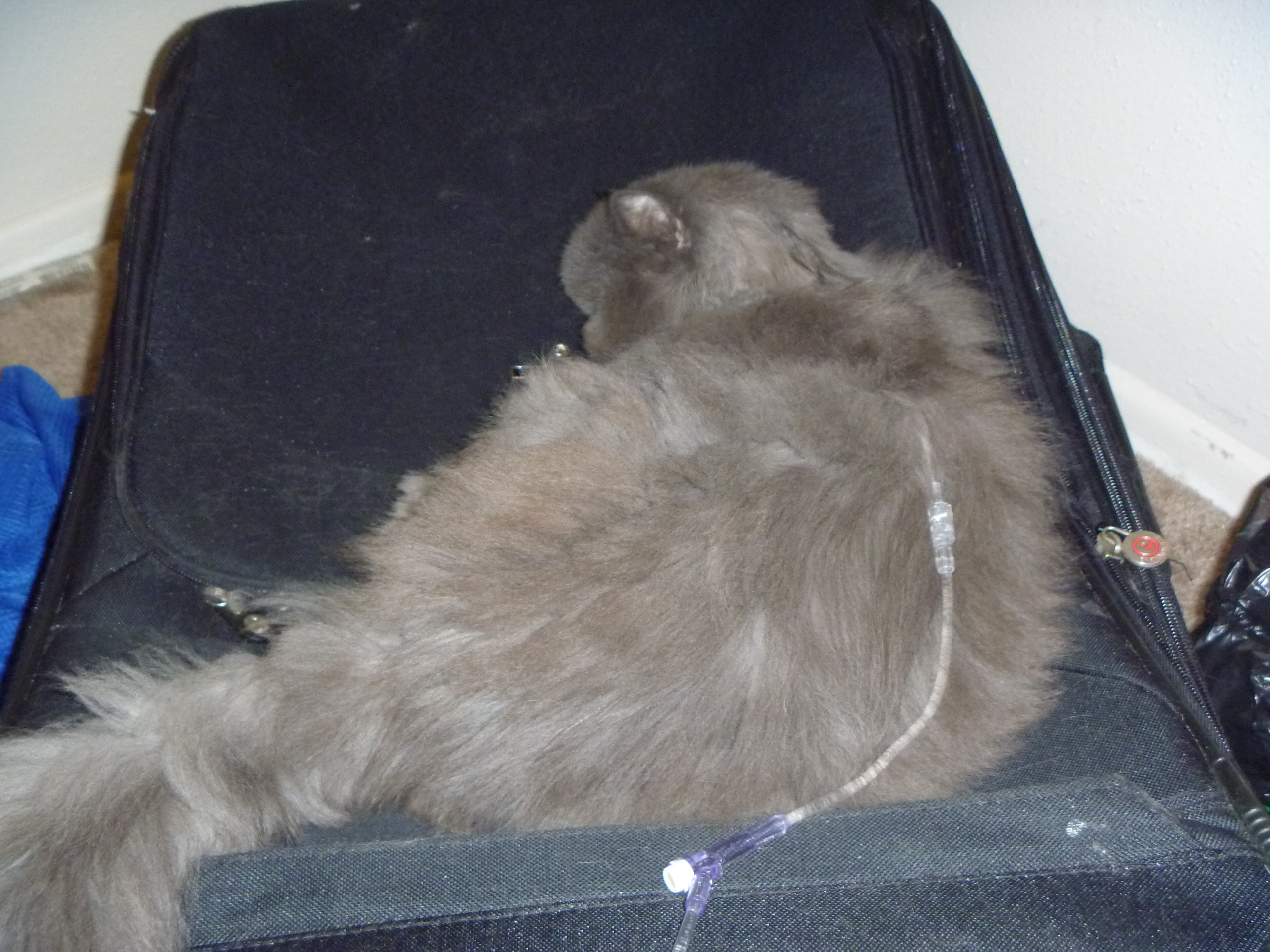
Persian with kidney disease receiving subcutaneous infusion of Lactated Ringer's solution

=== Abyssinian ===
Abyssinians can be affected by glomerular amyloidosis between the ages of one and five years. It progresses to renal failure. Findings include protein in the urine. It is inherited.

=== Persian ===
Persians can be affected by polycystic kidney disease, characterized by small cysts in the kidneys. It is inherited through an autosomal dominant mechanism and can progress to kidney disease later in life.
