= George Lignac =

Dutch pathologist

George Otto Emil Lignac (30 August 1891 – 5 September 1954) was a Dutch pathologist-anatomist.

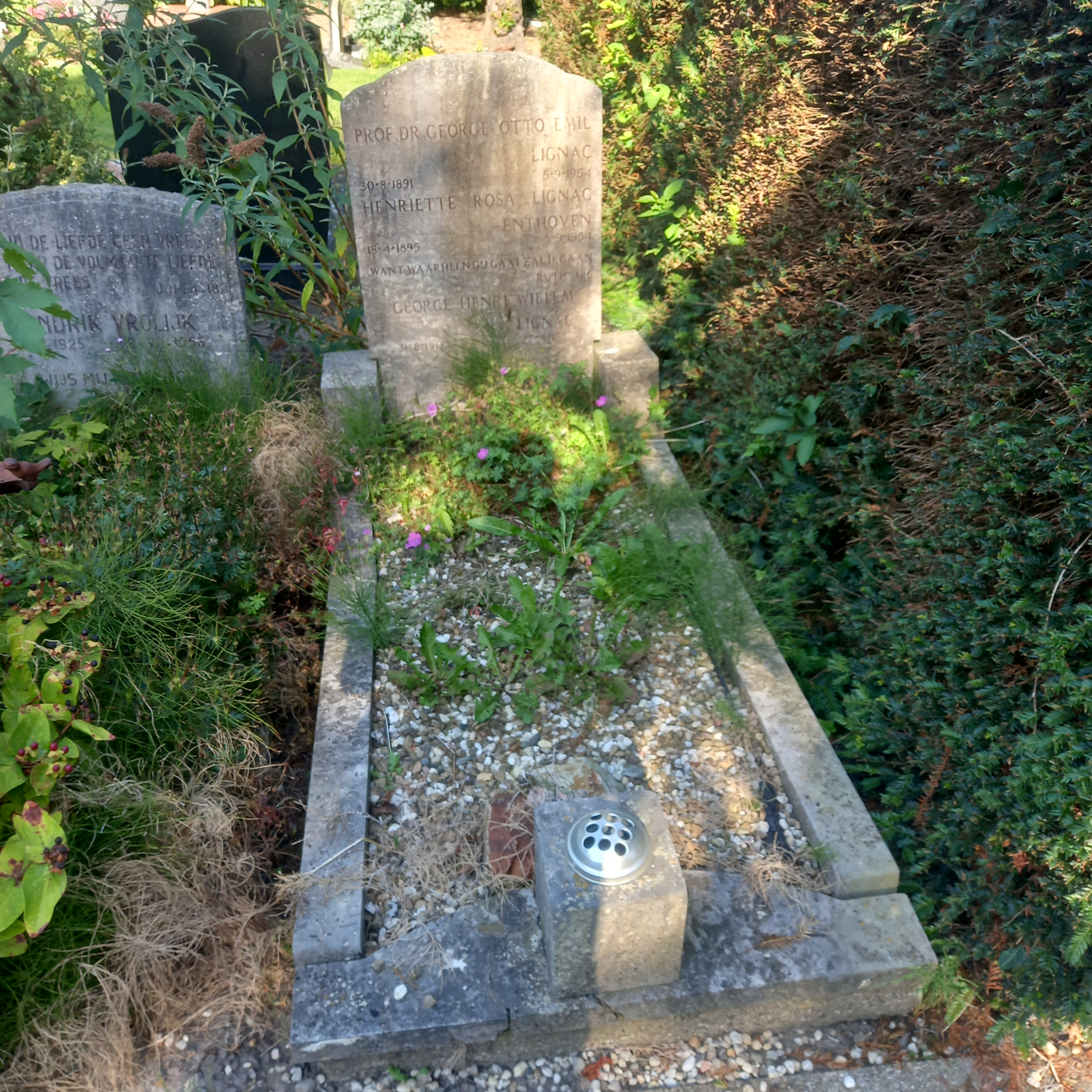
Grave of George Lignac and his wife Henriette Rosita Einthoven at reformed cemetery Oegstgeest

Lignac was born in Passoeroean, Java, Dutch East Indies, where his father worked as a civil servant. He studied medicine at Leiden and then returned to the Dutch East Indies and was a teacher at the STOVIA (School tot Opleiding van Indische Artsen or "school for the training of Indian physicians") in Batavia.

He returned to the Netherlands and was appointed professor of pathology, general diseases, pathological anatomy, and juridical medicine at Leiden University in 1934.

He published work on skin pigmentation, cysteine metabolism and the carcinogenic nature of benzol and many more.

The Abderhalden–Kaufmann–Lignac syndrome (Cystinosis) is named for Emil Abderhalden, Eduard Kaufmann and George Lignac. Renal Fanconi syndrome has sometimes been called Lignac–Fanconi syndrome, as Lignac contributed to the study of it.

Lignac died in a plane crash in the river Shannon (Ireland) in 1954 on board KLM flight 633. He was succeeded in 1956 by Prof. Dr. Th.G. van Rijssel.
