= Sodium-dependent phosphate transport protein 2C =

Protein-coding gene in the species Homo sapiens

SLC34A3

Identifiers
- Aliases: SLC34A3, HHRH, NPTIIc, solute carrier family 34 member 3, NaP2b
- External IDs: OMIM: 609826; MGI: 2159410; GeneCards: SLC34A3

Gene location (Human)
Chr.	Chromosome 9 (human)
Band	9q34.3	Start	137,230,757 bp
Band	9q34.3	End	137,236,555 bp

Gene location (Mouse)
Chr.	Chromosome 2 (mouse)
Band	2|2 A3	Start	25,118,910 bp
Band	2|2 A3	End	25,124,376 bp
RNA expression pattern
Bgee	Human / Mouse (ortholog); Top expressed in: right uterine tube; sural nerve; pituitary gland; anterior pituitary; endothelial cell; human kidney; skin of hip; olfactory zone of nasal mucosa; gastric mucosa; right frontal lobe / Top expressed in: right kidney; human kidney; embryo; lumbar subsegment of spinal cord; yolk sac; epithelium of small intestine; embryo; ileum; otic vesicle; stria vascularis; More reference expression data
BioGPS	n/a
Gene ontology
Molecular function	symporter activity; sodium:phosphate symporter activity
Cellular component	integral component of membrane; plasma membrane; membrane; vesicle; cytoplasm; brush border; apical plasma membrane; brush border membrane
Biological process	phosphate ion transport; cellular phosphate ion homeostasis; sodium ion transmembrane transport; sodium-dependent phosphate transport; sodium ion transport; transmembrane transport; ion transport
Sources:Amigo / QuickGO
Orthologs
Databases	NCBI: entry; OMA: entry
Species	Human	Mouse
Entrez	142680	142681
Ensembl	ENSG00000198569	ENSMUSG00000006469
UniProt	Q8N130	Q80SU6
RefSeq (mRNA)	NM_001177316; NM_001177317; NM_080877	NM_080854; NM_001362748
RefSeq (protein)	NP_001170787; NP_001170788; NP_543153	NP_543130; NP_001349677
Location (UCSC)	Chr 9: 137.23 – 137.24 Mb	Chr 2: 25.12 – 25.12 Mb
PubMed search
- Wikidata
View/Edit Human	View/Edit Mouse

Sodium-dependent phosphate transport protein 2C is a protein that in humans is encoded by the SLC34A3 gene.

== Function ==
SLC34A3 contributes to the maintenance of inorganic phosphate concentration at the kidney.

== Interactions ==
SLC34A3 has been shown to interact with PDZK1.

== Clinical Correlation ==
A mutation in the SLC34A3 gene has been known to cause the autosomal recessive condition hereditary hypophosphatemic rickets with hypercalciuria. This gene is correlated closely with SLC34A1, an analogue sodium phosphate cotransporter protein. Symptoms include renal phosphate wasting in addition to increase levels of 1,25-dihydroxyvitamin D (yields the hypercalciuria).

== See also ==
- SLC34A3+protein,+human at the U.S. National Library of Medicine Medical Subject Headings (MeSH)
