= Sodium-dependent phosphate transport protein 2B =

Protein-coding gene in the species Homo sapiens

SLC34A2

Identifiers
- Aliases: SLC34A2, NAPI-3B, NAPI-IIb, NPTIIb, solute carrier family 34 member 2, PULAM
- External IDs: OMIM: 604217; MGI: 1342284; GeneCards: SLC34A2

Gene location (Human)
Chr.	Chromosome 4 (human)
Band	4p15.2	Start	25,648,011 bp
Band	4p15.2	End	25,678,748 bp

Gene location (Mouse)
Chr.	Chromosome 5 (mouse)
Band	5 C1|5 28.92 cM	Start	53,195,423 bp
Band	5 C1|5 28.92 cM	End	53,229,006 bp
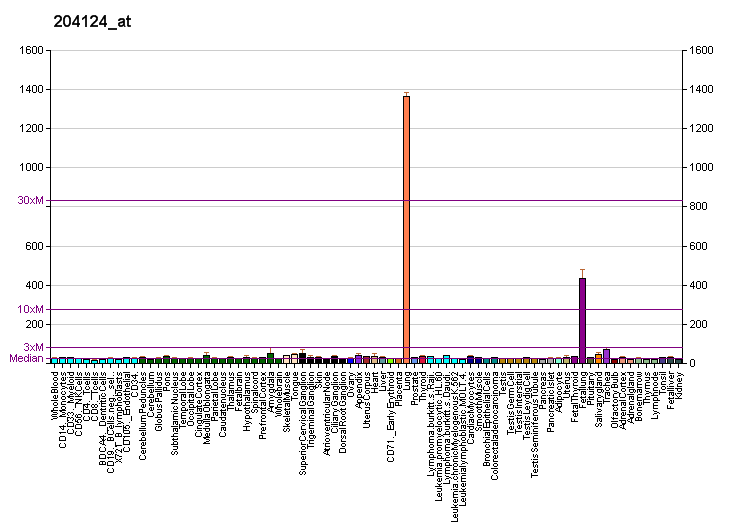
RNA expression pattern
Bgee	Human / Mouse (ortholog); Top expressed in: lower lobe of lung; palpebral conjunctiva; upper lobe of lung; upper lobe of left lung; bronchial epithelial cell; right lung; right uterine tube; endometrium; minor salivary glands; right lobe of thyroid gland / Top expressed in: left lung; left lung lobe; right lung; right lung lobe; ileum; jejunum; spermatocyte; spermatid; corneal stroma; morula; More reference expression data
BioGPS	More reference expression data
Gene ontology
Molecular function	phosphate ion binding; sodium ion binding; sodium:phosphate symporter activity; symporter activity
Cellular component	integral component of membrane; vesicle; membrane; plasma membrane; integral component of plasma membrane; brush border membrane; apical plasma membrane; brush border; cytoplasm
Biological process	phosphate ion transport; sodium-dependent phosphate transport; sodium ion transport; cellular phosphate ion homeostasis; in utero embryonic development; response to estrogen; phosphate ion transmembrane transport; sodium ion transmembrane transport; ion transport; transmembrane transport; transport
Sources:Amigo / QuickGO
Orthologs
Databases	NCBI: entry; OMA: entry
Species	Human	Mouse
Entrez	10568	20531
Ensembl	ENSG00000157765	ENSMUSG00000029188
UniProt	O95436	Q9DBP0
RefSeq (mRNA)	NM_006424; NM_001177998; NM_001177999	NM_011402
RefSeq (protein)	NP_001171469; NP_001171470; NP_006415	NP_035532
Location (UCSC)	Chr 4: 25.65 – 25.68 Mb	Chr 5: 53.2 – 53.23 Mb
PubMed search
- Wikidata
View/Edit Human	View/Edit Mouse

Sodium-dependent phosphate transport protein 2B (NaPi2b) is a protein that in humans is encoded by the SLC34A2 gene.

== Clinical significance ==
Sodium-dependent phosphate transport protein 2b (NaPi2b) is a tumor-associated antigen.

upifitamab rilsodotin, an antibody-drug conjugate (ADC) targeting NaPi2b, was evaluated in Phase 3 clinical trials for recurrent platinum-sensitive ovarian cancer. The trials were, however, terminated in September of 2023 by the sponsor.

== See also ==
- Solute carrier family
- Pulmonary alveolar microlithiasis
