= NiCoT family =

Family of transport proteins

Proteins currently known to belong to the Ni^{2+}-Co^{2+} Transporter (NiCoT) family (TC# 2.A.52) can be found in organisms ranging from Gram-negative and Gram-positive bacteria to archaea and some eukaryotes. Members of this family catalyze uptake of Ni^{2+} and/or Co^{2+} in a proton motive force-dependent process.

== Structure ==
These proteins range in size from about 300 to 400 amino acyl residues and possess 6, 7, or 8 transmembrane segments (TMSs), thought to result from an intragenic 4 TMS duplication, followed by a deletion of one or two TMSs in the cases of the 7 or 6 TMS proteins. Topological analyses with the HoxN Ni^{2+} transporter of Ralstonia eutropha (Alcaligenes eutrophus) suggest that it possesses 8 TMSs with its N- and C-termini in the cytoplasm. The Co^{2+} (Ni^{2+}) transporter of Rhodococcus rhodochrous, NhlF, exhibits eight putative TMSs, and eight apparent TMSs are revealed by hydropathy analyses of multiple alignments of family protein sequences. An HX^{4}DH motif in helix 2 of the HoxN protein has been implicated in Ni^{2+} binding, and both helix 1 and helix 2, which interact spatially, form the selectivity filter. In the Helicobacter pylori NixA homologue, several conserved motifs have been shown to be important for Ni^{2+} binding and transport.

At least one crystal structure is known, determined by Yu et al., available at PDB: 4M58.

== Reaction ==
The overall reaction catalyzed by the proteins of the NiCoT family is:

[Ni^{2+} and/or Co^{2+}] (out) → [Ni^{2+} and/or Co^{2+}] (in).

== Proteins ==
Several characterized proteins belong to the Ni^{2+}-Co^{2+} Transporter (NiCoT) Family (TC# 2.A.43). A complete list of these proteins along with their transporter classification identification numbers (TCID), domain, kingdom/phylum, and some examples can be found in the Transporter Classification Database.
