= TSUP family =

Proteins

The 4-Toluene Sulfonate Uptake Permease (TSUP) family (TC# 2.A.102) is also referred to as the TauE/SafE/YfcA/DUF81 Family.

Although its members have not been rigorously characterized, evidence is available that at least some members function in the transport of Sulfur containing Organic compounds. These include 4-toluene sulfonate which may be transported by the TsaS of Cupriavidus necator (TC# 2.A.102.1.1), sulfolactate which may be exported by the TauE protein of Cupriavidus necator (TC# 2.A.102.2.1) and sulfoacetate which may be exported by the SafE1 protein of Neptuniibacter caesariensis (TC# 2.A.102.2.2). Another member of the TSUP family, TsaS of Comamonas testosteroni, has been reported to function in the uptake of 4-toluene sulfonate. None of these functional assignments can be considered to be certain.
