= Pulmonary alveolar microlithiasis =

- Pulmonary alveolar microlithiasis is inherited in an autosomal recessive manner
- Specialty: Pulmonology

Pulmonary alveolar microlithiasis (PAM) is a rare, inherited disorder of lung phosphate balance that is associated with small stone formation in the airspaces of the lung. Mutations in the gene SLC34A2 result in loss of a key sodium, phosphate co-transporter (called Npt2b), known to be expressed in distal alveolar type II cells, as well as in the mammary gland, and to a lesser extent in intestine, kidney, skin, prostate and testes. As the disease progresses, the lung fields become progressively more dense (white) on the chest xray, and low oxygen level, lung inflammation and fibrosis, elevated pressures in the lung blood vessels, and respiratory failure ensue, usually in middle age. The clinical course of PAM can be highly variable, with some patients remaining asymptomatic for decades, and others progressing more rapidly. There is no effective treatment, and the mechanisms of stone formation, inflammation and scarring are not known.

== Signs and symptoms ==
Patients typically have no symptoms until the third or fourth decade of life, although complications in childhood have been recorded In most cases, the disease is discovered incidentally on routine chest Xray. The most common symptoms include the following:

- dyspnea
- dry cough
- chest pain
- sporadic hemoptysis
- asthenia
- pneumothoraces

== Genetics ==
PAM is hereditary and another involved family member can be identified in 36% to 61% of cases. Impaired activity of the SLC34A2 gene is responsible for PAM. At present, 27 mutations are known to be related to the development of the pulmonary alveolar microlithiasis phenotype and manifestation of the disorder, and of these mutations most genotypes reveal a homozygous mutation of the SLC34A2 gene. The SLC34A2 gene encodes a membrane protein that is expressed primarily in the apical portions of alveolar type II cells and is the most abundant phosphate carrier in the lungs. Identified on chromosome 4p15, the SLC34A gene encodes Npt2b, the sodium phosphate co-transporter, and 12 of the 13 exons located within the gene encode this co-transporter.

== Pathogenesis ==
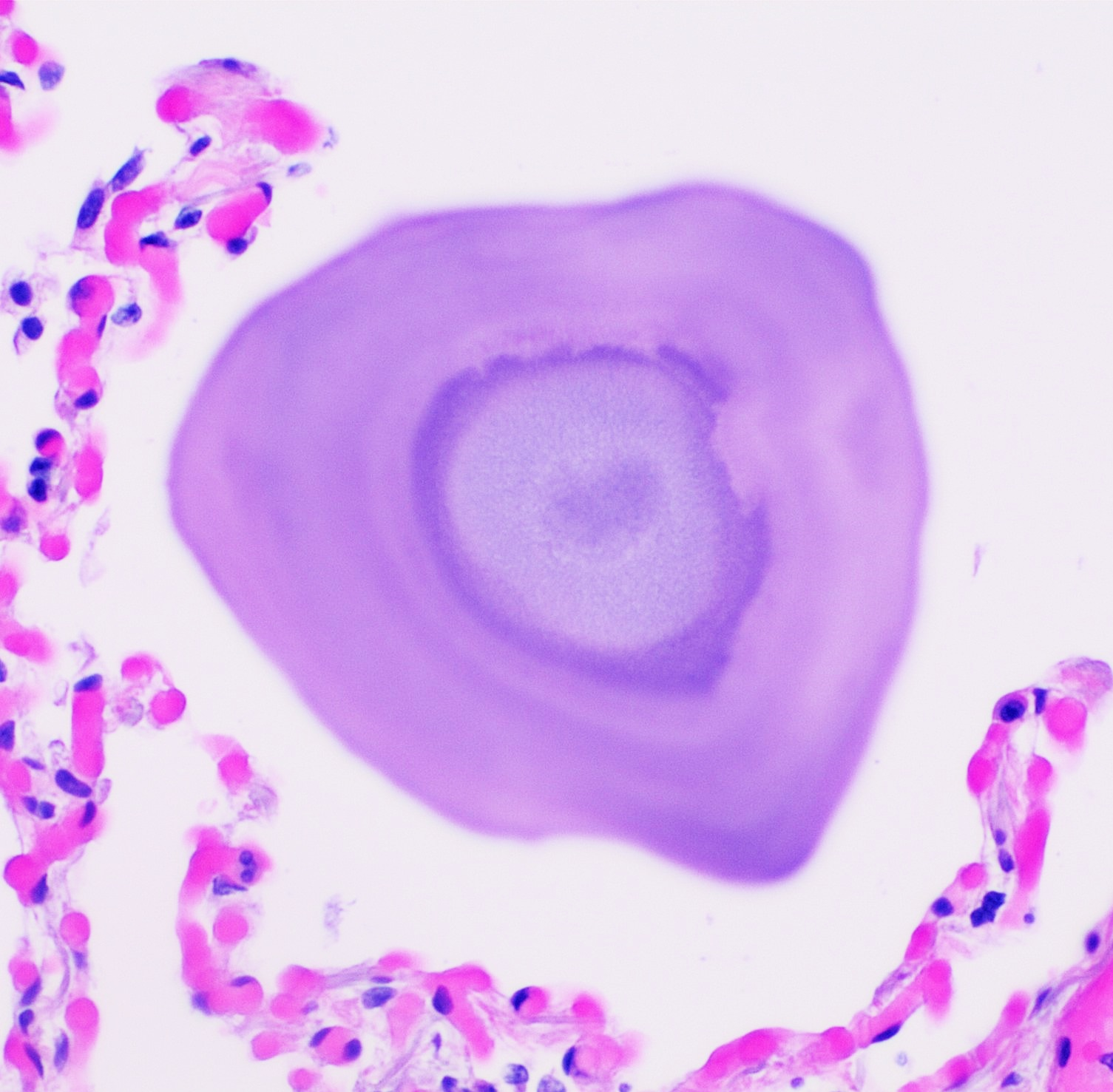
Histopathology of an alveolar microlith.

Type II alveolar cells have many important functions in the lung, including the production of pulmonary surfactant, maintenance of fluid balance and composition in the airspace. Phospholipids that make up pulmonary surfactant are broken down by macrophages, releasing phosphate into the alveolar lining fluid. The loss of the Npt2b phosphate transported eliminates the ability of alveolar type II cells to pump phosphorus ions from the alveolar space back into the bloodstream, and leads to microlith formation.

Epithelial deletion of Npt2b in mice results in an authentic mimic of the human condition, including accumulation of calcium phosphate microliths in the lung tissue and progressive diffuse radiographic opacities. The mouse model provides a useful platform for preclinical studies, including therapeutic trials of EDTA lavage and low phosphate diet/phosphate binders.

=== Pathology ===
PAM may be confined to certain areas or show diffuse distribution through the lungs. Lung biopsy and autopsy specimens demonstrate characteristic intra-alveolar lamellar microliths. Calcium deposits in the alveoli begin in the lower lobes and spread over a period of years throughout the lungs.

== Diagnosis ==
PAM is usually diagnosed on the basis of a typical radiological pattern, namely a very fine, sand-like micronodulation of calcific density diffusely involving both lungs, with basal predominance. Many authors argue that this pattern precludes the need for a lung biopsy in most cases. After PAM is diagnosed in a given patient, family members should be screened by chest radiography, and parents should be counseled that future children are also at risk of developing the disease.

=== Radiology ===
Chest radiographs of patients with PAM usually reveal bilateral diffuse micronodular calcifications, producing a "sandstorm" appearance that first involves the inferior portions and then the middle and upper portions of the lungs.

=== High-resolution computed tomography ===
The most common findings on HRCT are diffuse hyperdense ground-glass attenuation and subpleural linear calcifications, often most predominant in the inferior and posterior portions of the lungs. Additionally, the medial aspects of the lungs appear to be more heavily involved than the lateral aspects. Ground-glass opacities, probably due to small calculi in the air space, are the most common finding in children and in patients with early-stage PAM.

=== Magnetic resonance imaging ===
On magnetic resonance imaging (MRI), the calcific lesions usually show hypointensity or a signal void on T1- and T2-weighted images.

=== Pulmonary function studies ===
Pulmonary function tests, arterial blood gases, ventilation perfusion relationships, and O2 diffusing capacity are normal in the initial stages of PAM. As the disease progresses, pulmonary function tests reveal typical features of a restrictive defect with reduced forced vital capacity (FVC) and elevated forced expiratory volume in FEV1/FVC.

== Treatment ==
To date, no treatment has been proven to reverse or prevent the progression of PAM effectively. Lung transplantation is an option for the end-stage disease but is typically only recommended as a last resort when the quality of life is significantly impaired.

Although no effective treatment exists, there are several common supportive care approaches that can alleviate symptoms resulting from PAM. Domiciliary oxygen should be prescribed to the patient for hypoxemia to prevent manifest desaturation.

Etidronate is a bisphosphonate and can reduce the formation of calcium hydroxyapatite crystals. It has led to clinical and radiological improvements in few cases.

Smoking should be prohibited for patients to avoid exacerbating disease progression.

== Epidemiology ==
Since the disease was first described in 1918, over 500 case reports have appeared in the literature. PAM is associated with consanguinity. The incidence is higher in Turkey, Japan, India and Italy. The disease affects both men and women equally, and it has been associated with intermarriage within families. The mean age at diagnosis is 35 years based on the cases reported in the literature.

== Society ==
PAM is one of the rare lung diseases currently being studied by the Rare Lung Diseases Consortium. Pulmonary Alveolar Microlithiasis patients, families, and caregivers are encouraged to join the NIH Rare Lung Diseases Consortium Contact Registry. This is a privacy protected site that provides up-to-date information for individuals interested in the latest scientific news, trials, and treatments related to rare lung diseases.
