= Fanconi syndrome =

Kidney disorder

- Other names: Fanconi's syndrome
- Specialty: Nephrology, endocrinology

Fanconi syndrome or Fanconi's syndrome (English: /fɑːnˈkoʊni/, /fæn-/) is a syndrome of inadequate reabsorption in the proximal renal tubules of the kidney. The syndrome can be caused by various underlying congenital or acquired diseases, by toxicity (for example, from toxic heavy metals), or by adverse drug reactions. It results in various small molecules of metabolism being passed into the urine instead of being reabsorbed from the tubular fluid (for example, glucose, amino acids, uric acid, phosphate, and bicarbonate). Fanconi syndrome affects the proximal tubules, namely, the proximal convoluted tubule (PCT), which is the first part of the tubule to process fluid after it is filtered through the glomerulus, and the proximal straight tubule (pars recta), which leads to the descending limb of loop of Henle.

Different forms of Fanconi syndrome can affect different functions of the proximal tubule, and result in different complications. The loss of bicarbonate results in type 2 or proximal renal tubular acidosis. The loss of phosphate results in the bone diseases rickets and osteomalacia (even with adequate vitamin D and calcium levels), because phosphate is necessary for bone development in children and even for ongoing bone metabolism in adults.

== Presentation ==
The clinical features of proximal renal tubular acidosis are:

- Polyuria, polydipsia and dehydration
- Hypophosphatemic rickets (in children) and osteomalacia (in adults)
- Growth failure
- Acidosis
- Hypokalemia
- Hyperchloremia

Other features of the generalized proximal tubular dysfunction of the Fanconi syndrome are:

- Hypophosphatemia/hyperphosphaturia
- Glycosuria
- Proteinuria/aminoaciduria
- Hyperuricosuria

== Causes ==
In contrast to Hartnup disease and related tubular conditions, Fanconi syndrome affects the transport of many different substances, so is not considered to be a defect in a specific channel, but a more general defect in the function of the proximal tubules.

Different diseases underlie Fanconi syndrome; they can be inherited, congenital, or acquired.

=== Inherited ===
Cystinosis is the most common cause of Fanconi syndrome in children.

Other recognised causes are Wilson's disease (a genetically inherited condition of copper metabolism), Lowe syndrome, tyrosinemia (type I), galactosemia, glycogen storage diseases, and hereditary fructose intolerance.

Two forms, Dent's disease and Lowe syndrome, are X linked.

A recently described form of this disease is due to a mutation in the peroxisomal protein EHHADH. This mutation misdirects the EHHADH to the mitochondria. This interferes with respiratory complex I and with beta oxidation of fatty acids. The result is a decrease in the ability of the mitochondria to produce ATP.

It was shown that a specific mutation (R76W) of HNF4A, a gene encoding a transcription factor, causes Fanconi syndrome in human. In the kidney, HNF4A is expressed in the proximal tubules specifically. Deletion of Hnf4a in the developing mouse kidney caused Fanconi syndrome phenotypes including polyuria, polydipsia, glycosuria, and phosphaturia. The Hnf4a mutant kidney showed a defect in the formation of proximal tubules.

=== Acquired ===
It is possible to acquire this disease later in life.

Causes include ingesting expired tetracyclines (where tetracycline changes to form epitetracycline and anhydrotetracycline which damage the proximal tubule), and as a side effect of tenofovir in cases of pre-existing renal impairment. In the HIV population, Fanconi syndrome can develop secondary to the use of an antiretroviral regimen containing tenofovir and didanosine. Lead poisoning also leads to Fanconi syndrome.

Multiple myeloma or monoclonal gammopathy of undetermined significance can also cause the condition.

Additionally, Fanconi syndrome can develop as a secondary or tertiary effect of certain autoimmune disorders.

== Diagnosis ==
Fanconi syndrome is diagnosed through a combination of physical examination, blood and urine tests, and potentially genetic testing. Key findings include high levels of glucose, amino acids, and phosphate in the urine despite normal or low blood levels of these substances, and low levels of phosphate, bicarbonate, and potassium in the blood.

== Treatment ==
Treatment of children with Fanconi syndrome mainly consists of replacement of substances lost in the urine (mainly fluid and bicarbonate).

== Eponym ==
It is named after Guido Fanconi, a Swiss pediatrician, although various other scientists, including George Lignac in 1924, contributed to its study. It should not be confused with Fanconi anemia, a separate disease.

== See also ==
- Familial renal disease in animals - an equivalent disorder found in Basenjis
