= Cystinosis =

Lysosomal storage disease

- Other names: Cystine storage disease, Abderhalden–Lignac–Kaufmann disease, Abderhalden–Kaufmann–Lignac syndrome
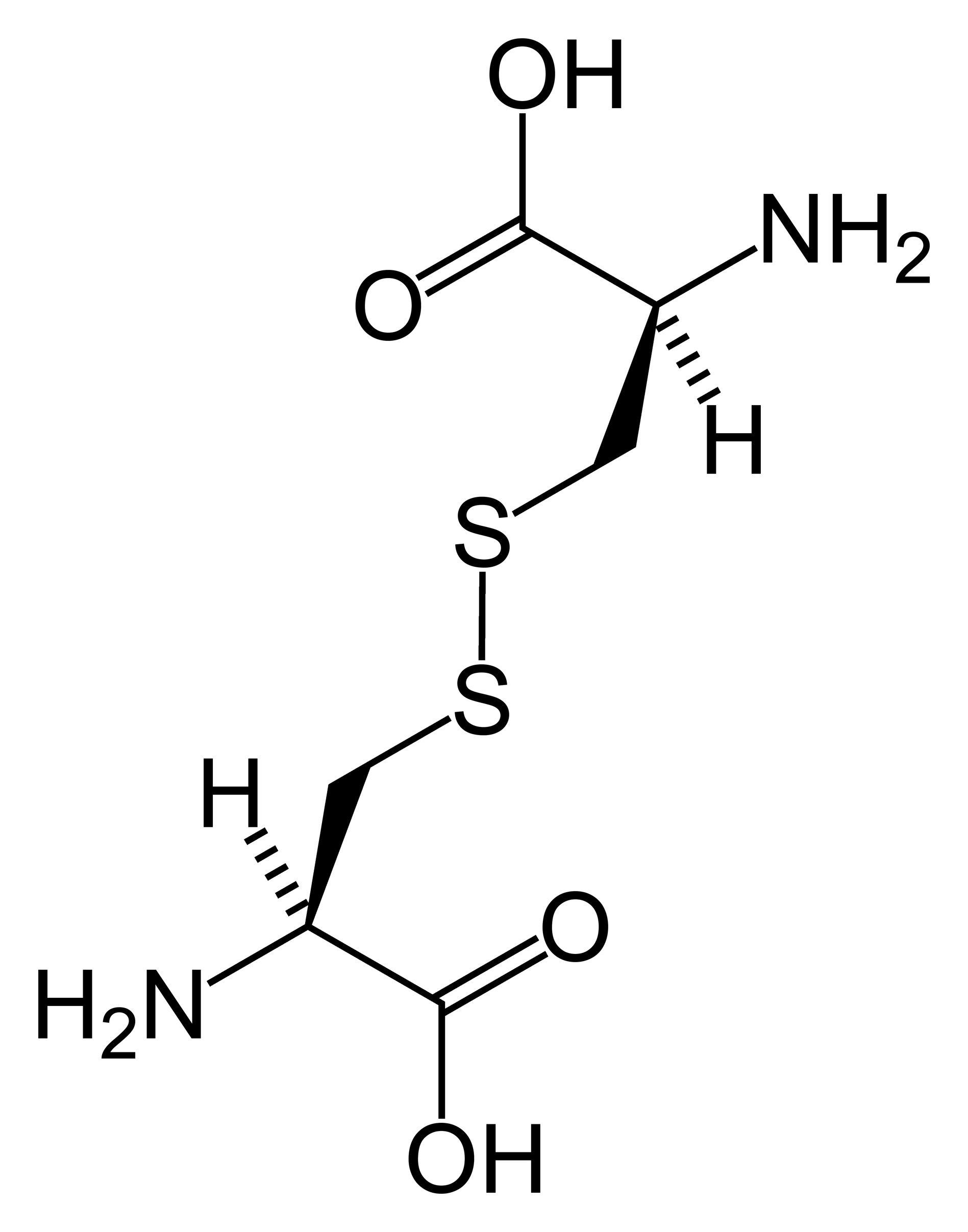
- Chemical structure of cystine formed from L-cysteine (under biological conditions)
- Specialty: Endocrinology
- Frequency: 0.005%

Cystinosis is a lysosomal storage disease characterized by the abnormal accumulation of free cystine, the oxidized dimer of the amino acid cysteine in lysosomes, eventually leading to intracellular crystal formation throughout the body, e.g. in kidneys.

It is genetically inheritable in the autosomal recessive fashion via CTNS (AR) gene. It is characterized by systemic accumulation of the amino acid cystine within lysosomes, proximal tubulopathy, and by progressive chronic kidney disease. If untreated, it leads to progressive cellular dysfunction and multiorgan involvement. The disease most commonly presents in infancy with renal Fanconi syndrome and, without treatment, progresses to end-stage kidney disease (ESKD) in childhood. Extra-renal manifestations affecting the eyes, thyroid, muscle, pancreas, and central nervous system may develop later in life. Early diagnosis and lifelong cystine-depleting therapy improve growth, delay progression to ESKD, and reduce many systemic complications. Nevertheless, despite treatment, the mean age at death for individuals born between 1985 and 1999 has been 29 years.

Cystinosis is the most common cause of Fanconi syndrome in the pediatric age group. Fanconi syndrome occurs when the function of cells in renal tubules is impaired, leading to abnormal amounts of carbohydrates and amino acids in the urine, excessive urination, and low blood levels of potassium and phosphates.

Cystinosis was the first documented genetic disease belonging to the group of lysosomal storage disease disorders. Cystinosis is caused by mutations in the CTNS gene that codes for cystinosin, the lysosomal membrane-specific transporter for cystine. Intracellular metabolism of cystine, as it happens with all amino acids, requires its transport across the cell membrane. After degradation of endocytosed protein to cystine within lysosomes, it is normally transported to the cytosol. But if there is a defect in the carrier protein, cystine is accumulated in lysosomes. As cystine is highly insoluble, when its concentration in tissue lysosomes increases, its solubility is immediately exceeded and crystalline precipitates are formed in almost all organs and tissues.

However, the progression of the disease is not related to the presence of crystals in target tissues. Although tissue damage might depend on cystine accumulation, the mechanisms of tissue damage are not fully understood. Increased intracellular cystine profoundly disturbs cellular oxidative metabolism and glutathione status, leading to altered mitochondrial energy metabolism, autophagy, and apoptosis.

Cystinosis is usually treated with cysteamine, which is prescribed to decrease intralysosomal cystine accumulation. However, the discovery of new pathogenic mechanisms and the development of an animal model of the disease may open possibilities for the development of new treatment modalities to improve long-term prognosis.

== Classification ==
- Infantile (classic) nephropathic cystinosis Online Mendelian Inheritance in Man (OMIM): 219800: the most common and severe form, presenting within the first year of life with Fanconi syndrome and rapid progression to renal failure.
- Juvenile (intermediate) cystinosis Online Mendelian Inheritance in Man (OMIM): 219900: later onset and slower progression.
- Ocular (non-nephropathic or adult) cystinosis Online Mendelian Inheritance in Man (OMIM): 219750: primarily limited to the eyes with minimal or no renal involvement.

== Symptoms and signs ==
There are three distinct types of cystinosis each with slightly different symptoms: nephropathic cystinosis, intermediate cystinosis, and non-nephropathic or ocular cystinosis. Infants affected by nephropathic cystinosis initially exhibit poor growth and particular kidney problems (sometimes called renal Fanconi syndrome). The kidney problems lead to the loss of important minerals, salts, fluids, and other nutrients. The loss of nutrients not only impairs growth, but may result in soft, bowed bones (hypophosphatemic rickets), especially in the legs. The nutrient imbalances in the body lead to increased urination, thirst, dehydration, and abnormally acidic blood (acidosis).

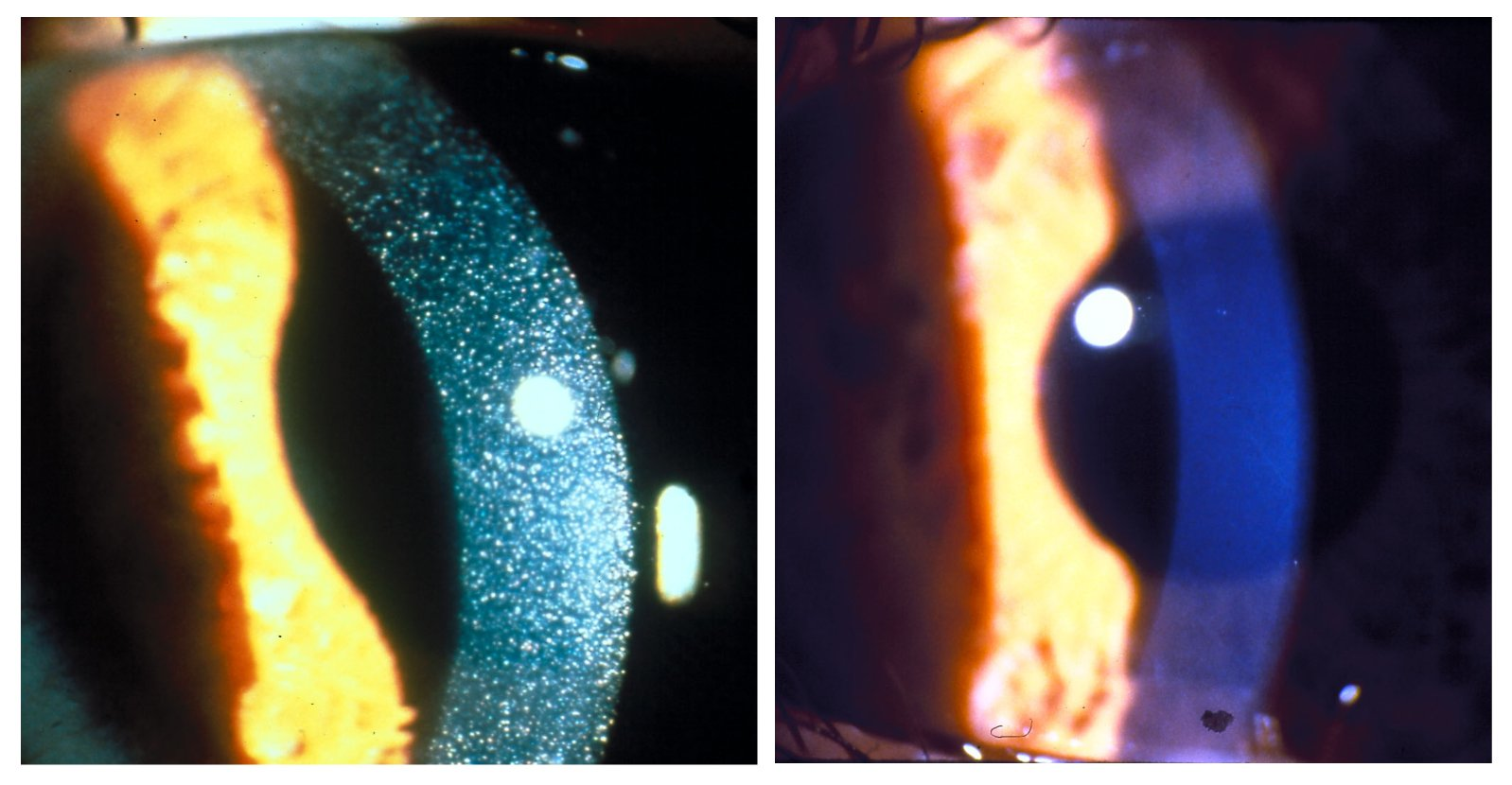
Slit-lamp photographs of three-year-old patient with nephropathic cystinosis before (left) and after (right) cysteamine eyedrop therapy. The drops dissolve the crystals in the cornea.

Presentation in the first 6–12 months with poor growth, polyuria, polydipsia, dehydration, and rickets secondary to proximal renal tubular dysfunction (Fanconi syndrome) causing urinary wasting of glucose, amino acids, bicarbonate, phosphate, and electrolytes. Progressive glomerular damage leading to chronic kidney disease and eventually to End Stage Kidney Disease typically in the first decade, if untreated.

By about age two, cystine crystals may also be present in the cornea. The buildup of these crystals in the eye causes an increased sensitivity to light (photophobia). Without treatment, children with cystinosis are likely to experience complete kidney failure by about age ten. With treatment this may be delayed into the patients' teens or 20s. Other signs and symptoms that may occur in patients include muscle deterioration, blindness, inability to swallow, impaired sweating, decreased hair and skin pigmentation, diabetes, and thyroid and nervous system problems.

The signs and symptoms of intermediate cystinosis are the same as nephropathic cystinosis, but they occur at a later age. Intermediate cystinosis typically begins to affect individuals around age twelve to fifteen. Malfunctioning kidneys and corneal crystals are the main initial features of this disorder. If intermediate cystinosis is left untreated, complete kidney failure will occur, but usually not until the late teens to mid twenties.

People with non-nephropathic or ocular cystinosis do not usually experience growth impairment or kidney malfunction. The only symptom is photophobia due to cystine crystals in the cornea.

=== Crystal morphology and identification ===
Cystine crystals are hexagonal in shape and are colorless. They are not found often in alkaline urine due to their high solubility. The colorless crystals can be difficult to distinguish from uric acid crystals which are also hexagonal. Under polarized examination, the crystals are birefringent with a polarization color interference.

== Pathophysiology ==
Nephropathic cystinosis is caused by pathogenic variants in the CTNS gene (encoding cystinosin), located on chromosome 17p13, which encodes a lysosomal membrane protein required for cystine transport out of lysosomes. Loss of cystinosin function leads to intralysosomal accumulation of cystine crystals, which cause cellular dysfunction and apoptosis through mechanisms that include oxidative stress and impaired autophagy. The degree of residual cystinosin function correlates with disease severity, accounting for the spectrum from classic infantile to milder forms.

== Diagnosis ==
Clinical suspicion:

Infants with Fanconi syndrome and failure to thrive; ophthalmologic findings (corneal crystals) support the diagnosis.

Measurement of leukocyte cystine levels: the diagnostic biochemical test is elevated cystine concentration in isolated white blood cells (leukocytes).

Genetic testing: molecular analysis of CTNS confirms the diagnosis and allows for carrier testing and prenatal diagnosis.

Additional testing: renal function and tubular markers, slit-lamp eye exam, thyroid function tests, and assessments for other systemic complications.

=== Complications ===
These complications often develop despite renal replacement therapy:

Ocular: corneal cystine crystal deposition causes photophobia, eye irritation, and decreased corneal sensitivity; crystals are visible on slit-lamp examination.

Endocrine: hypothyroidism is common; growth hormone deficiency and diabetes mellitus may occur later.

Myopathy and swallowing difficulties from progressive proximal muscle weakness and distal involvement in adults.

Neurologic: speech delay, cognitive impairment, and ataxia may appear in older children and adults.

Other: hepatomegaly, pancreatitis, and gonadal dysfunction have been reported.

== Genetics ==
Cystinosis has an autosomal recessive pattern of inheritance.

Cystinosis occurs due to a mutation in the gene CTNS, located on chromosome 17, which codes for cystinosin, the lysosomal cystine transporter. Symptoms are first seen at about 3 to 18 months of age with profound polyuria (excessive urination), followed by poor growth, photophobia, and ultimately kidney failure by age 6 years in the nephropathic form.

All forms of cystinosis (nephropathic, juvenile and ocular) are autosomal recessive, which means that the trait is located on an autosomal chromosome, and only an individual who inherits two copies of the gene – one from both parents – will have the disorder. There is a 25% risk of having a child with the disorder, when both parents are carriers of an autosomal recessive trait.

Cystinosis affects approximately 1 in 100,000 to 200,000 newborns. and there are only around 2,000 known individuals with cystinosis in the world. The incidence is higher in the province of Brittany, France, where the disorder affects 1 in 26,000 individuals.

== Diagnosis ==
Cystinosis is a rare genetic disorder that causes an accumulation of the amino acid cystine within cells, forming crystals that can build up and damage the cells. These crystals negatively affect many systems in the body, especially the kidneys and eyes.

The accumulation is caused by abnormal transport of cystine from lysosomes, resulting in a massive intra-lysosomal cystine accumulation in tissues. Via an as yet unknown mechanism, lysosomal cystine appears to amplify and alter apoptosis in such a way that cells die inappropriately, leading to loss of renal epithelial cells. This results in renal Fanconi syndrome, and similar loss in other tissues can account for the short stature, retinopathy, and other features of the disease.

Definitive diagnosis and treatment monitoring are most often performed through measurement of white blood cell cystine level using tandem mass spectrometry.

== Management ==
Current management aims to deplete intracellular cystine, treat renal tubular losses, preserve kidney function, and address systemic complications.

Cysteamine therapy: Cysteamine (cysteamine bitartrate) is the only specific disease-modifying therapy. It enters lysosomes and reacts with cystine to form cysteine–cysteamine mixed disulfides that can exit the lysosome via alternative transporters, thereby lowering intralysosomal cystine. Oral cysteamine, started early and given lifelong, markedly reduces leukocyte cystine levels, delays progression to ESKD, and decreases some systemic complications. Both immediate-release and delayed-release formulations are used; adherence and dose optimization are critical. Oral cysteamine therapy has extended the time to kidney failure by approximately 7 years (to a mean of 16 years) and mitigates or prevents late complications of the disease. In addition, cysteamine eyedrops can dissolve corneal cystine crystals within months.

Supportive renal care: replacement of bicarbonate, phosphate, potassium, vitamin D and other supplements to manage Fanconi syndrome; growth monitoring and, when indicated, growth hormone therapy.

Kidney transplantation: ESKD is managed with renal transplantation when necessary; however, transplantation does not correct systemic cystine accumulation, so cysteamine therapy should be continued after transplant.

Ocular treatment: topical cysteamine eye drops reduce corneal crystal burden and symptoms.

Multidisciplinary follow-up: regular monitoring by nephrology, ophthalmology, endocrinology, neurology, nutrition, and other specialties is recommended to manage complications and optimize quality of life.

== Treatment ==
Cystinosis is normally treated with cysteamine, which is available in capsules and in eye drops. Cysteamine acts to solubilize the cystine by (1) forming a mixed disulfide cysteine-cysteamine and (2) reducing cystine to cysteine. People with cystinosis are also often given sodium citrate to treat the blood acidosis, as well as potassium and phosphorus supplements as well as others. If the kidneys become significantly impaired or fail, then treatment must be begun to ensure continued survival, up to and including renal transplantation.

== Prognosis ==
Before the invention of cysteamine treatment in the 1970s, most children with classic nephropathic cystinosis reached end-stage chronic kidney disease (ESKD) by 10–12 years of age. With early and continuous cysteamine therapy and modern supportive care, renal survival has improved substantially and many patients survive into adulthood, although they remain at risk for extra-renal complications that affect morbidity.

Nevertheless, since cysteamine does not cure, but only slows down the disease progression, in many cases, the first kidney transplant in childhood/adolescence has to be followed by a second kidney transplant only 5–15 years later.

== History ==
Cystinosis was first described in the early 20th century by cystine crystal identification in tissues. A historical case of cystinosis was originally termed Abderhalden–Kaufmann–Lignac syndrome (AKL syndrome), also called nephropathic cystinosis, which was observed to be an autosomal recessive renal disorder of childhood comprising cystinosis and renal rickets. It was named for Emil Abderhalden, Eduard Kaufmann and George Lignac. Affected children are developmentally delayed with dwarfism, rickets and osteoporosis. Renal tubular disease is usually present causing aminoaciduria, glycosuria and hypokalemia. Cysteine deposition is most evident in the conjunctiva and cornea.

The CTNS gene was identified in the late 1990s, enabling genetic diagnosis and improved understanding of pathogenesis.

== See also ==
- Hartnup disease
- Cystinuria
- CTNS
- Cystinosin
