= CTNS (gene) =

Protein-coding gene in the species Homo sapiens

Identifiers
- Aliases: CTNS, CTNS-LSB, PQLC4, cystinosin, lysosomal cystine transporter, SLC66A4
- External IDs: OMIM: 606272; MGI: 1932872; GeneCards: CTNS

Gene location (Human)
Chr.	Chromosome 17 (human)
Band	17p13.2	Start	3,636,459 bp
Band	17p13.2	End	3,663,103 bp

Gene location (Mouse)
Chr.	Chromosome 11 (mouse)
Band	11|11 B4	Start	73,074,422 bp
Band	11|11 B4	End	73,089,868 bp
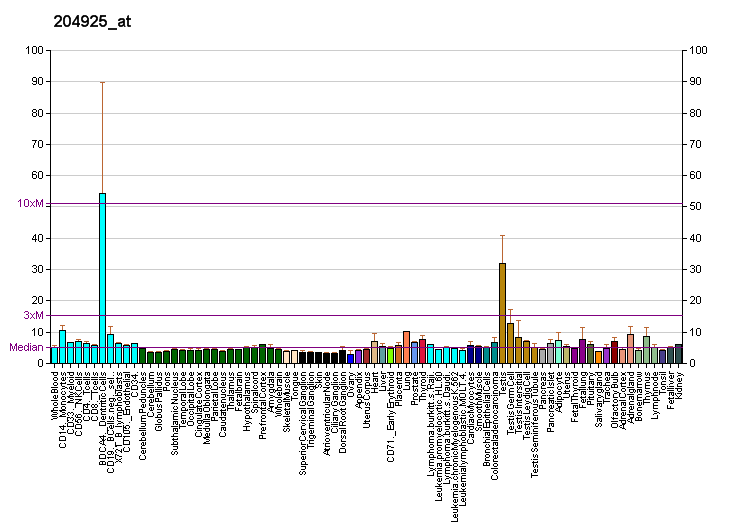

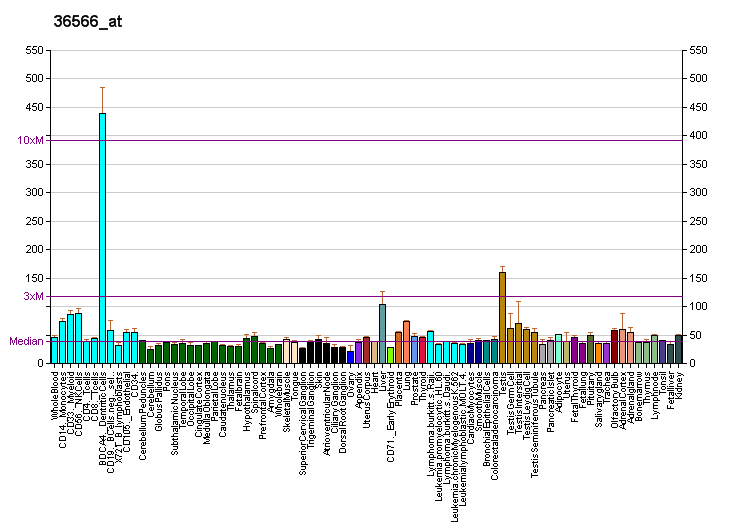
RNA expression pattern
Bgee	Human / Mouse (ortholog); Top expressed in: right adrenal cortex; left adrenal cortex; body of pancreas; right uterine tube; right testis; tibial nerve; left testis; canal of the cervix; body of stomach; stromal cell of endometrium / Top expressed in: lip; yolk sac; granulocyte; right kidney; seminal vesicula; secondary oocyte; muscle of thigh; transitional epithelium of urinary bladder; epithelium of small intestine; superior frontal gyrus; More reference expression data
BioGPS	More reference expression data
Gene ontology
Molecular function	L-cystine transmembrane transporter activity
Cellular component	late endosome; intermediate filament cytoskeleton; integral component of membrane; intracellular membrane-bounded organelle; early endosome; membrane; melanosome; lysosome; plasma membrane; extracellular exosome; lysosomal membrane; vacuolar membrane
Biological process	cognition; melanin biosynthetic process; transmembrane transport; glutathione metabolic process; visual learning; long-term memory; brain development; lens development in camera-type eye; adult walking behavior; ion transport; ATP metabolic process; cellular amino acid metabolic process; grooming behavior; L-cystine transport; transport; negative regulation of hydrogen peroxide biosynthetic process; positive regulation of mitochondrial membrane potential; negative regulation of reactive oxygen species biosynthetic process
Sources:Amigo / QuickGO
Orthologs
Databases	NCBI: entry; OMA: entry
Species	Human	Mouse
Entrez	1497	83429
Ensembl	ENSG00000040531	ENSMUSG00000005949
UniProt	O60931	P57757
RefSeq (mRNA)	NM_001031681; NM_004937; NM_001374492; NM_001374493; NM_001374494 NM_001374495; NM_001374496	NM_031251; NM_001357891; NM_001357892
RefSeq (protein)	NP_001026851; NP_004928; NP_001361421; NP_001361422; NP_001361423 NP_001361424; NP_001361425	NP_112541; NP_001344820; NP_001344821
Location (UCSC)	Chr 17: 3.64 – 3.66 Mb	Chr 11: 73.07 – 73.09 Mb
PubMed search
- Wikidata
View/Edit Human	View/Edit Mouse

CTNS may also refer to the Center for Theology and the Natural Sciences.

CTNS is the gene that encodes the protein cystinosin in humans. Cystinosin is a lysosomal seven-transmembrane protein that functions as an active transporter for the export of cystine molecules out of the lysosome.

Mutations in CTNS are responsible for cystinosis, an autosomal recessive lysosomal storage disease.

== Gene ==
The CTNS gene is located on the p arm of human chromosome 17, at position 13.2. It spans base pairs 3,636,468 and 3,661,542, and comprises 12 exons.

In 1995, the gene was localized to the short arm of chromosome 17. An international collaborative effort finally succeeded in isolating CTNS by positional cloning in 1998.

The CTNS^{N323K}, CTNS^{K280R}, and CTNS^{N288K} mutations completely stop the movement of CySS out of the lysosome via cystinosin.^{[2]} interestingly, CTNS^{N323K} and CTNS^{K280R} are related to juvenile nephropathic cystinosis while CTNS^{N288K} mutations are found in cases with infantile nephropathic cystinosis.

== Tissue distribution ==
The gene is expressed in the lysosomes of all organs and tissues. Cystinosin has also been found in melanosomes in melanocytes.

== Structure ==
Cystinosin is a seven-transmembrane domain receptor embedded in the lysosomal membrane, and is a member of the lysosomal cystine transporter family of transport proteins. It comprises 367 amino acid residues, and has a molecular mass of 41738 Da. Cystinosin has seven N-glycosylation sites in the N-terminus region, spanning a range of 128 amino acid residues.

The receptor also has two sorting motifs; a GYDQL motif in the C-terminus region, and a YFPQA motif, known as the 'PQ loop,' on the fifth inter-transmembrane α-helix moiety.

Cystinosin embeds in the lysosomal membrane with the C-terminus region facing the cytosol and the N-terminus region facing the lumen.

== Mechanism ==
The protein obeys Michaelis-Menton kinetics and has an associated K_{M} of 278 ± 49 μM.

The GYDQL and YFPQA motifs on the C-terminal binds cystinosin to the lysosome. Mutations in the GYDQL motif cause a repositioning of cystinosin to being partially on the plasma membrane and partially on the lysosome. Mutations in both GYDQL and YFPQA motifs cause cystinosin to position itself to the plasma membrane instead of lysosomes

An increase in acidity in the lumen of the lysosome initiates the reaction of CySS and H^{+} being transported into the cytosol.

== Function ==
Cystinosin functions as a symporter which actively transports protons and cystine, the oxidized cysteine dimer, out of the lysosome. Cystinosin only transports L-CySS while other cystine transporters will work on various amino acids. If cystine builds up in the lysosome it will inhibit the normal functioning of the organelle making the transport function important in the regular functioning of cells.

Cystinosin has also been discovered in melanosomes and has been linked to the control and regulation of melanin.

== Clinical significance ==
=== Cystinosis ===
Mutations in CTNS gene can result in cystinosis. Cystinosis is a type of lysosomal transport disorder, a subset of lysosomal storage disorders. Variation in the encoded cystinosin protein results in an inhibition or loss in its ability to transport cystine out of the lysosome. Cystine molecules accumulate and form crystals within the lysosome, impairing its function.

=== Mutations ===
Cystinosis is presented in patients with a range of CTNS mutations; as of 2017, over 100 have been identified. The most common mutation is a 57,257 base pair deletion commonly referred to as the 57 kb deletion. This was formally known as the 65 kb deletion; a misnomer originating from early incorrect estimates. Other reported mutations include other deletions, missense mutations, and in-frame deletions and insertions.

The type and extent of mutation determines the type and severity of cystinosis in the carrier. This is a result of the degree of transport inhibition caused by the misfolding of cystinosin. For example, mild cystinosis is typically associated with mutations that do not affect the amino acids in the transmembrane domains of cystinosin. In contrast, infantile nephropathic cystinosis, the most severe form of the disease, is most commonly associated with a total loss of activity.

Gene deletion resulting in the absence of either of the sorting motifs results in the delocalization of cystinosin to the cellular plasma membrane.

== Model systems ==
Human models for cystinosin are typically derived from cystinotic renal tubular cell lines.

Non-human protein homologs for cystinosin include ERS1 in Saccharomyces cerevisiae (yeast cells) and the Caenorhabditis elegans protein, C41C4.7. Murine ctns has also been used.

== See also ==
- Cystinosis
- Lysosomal storage disorders
- Lysosomal Cystine Transporter Family
