= Magnesium transporter1 family =

Group of transport proteins

The Magnesium Transporter 1 (MagT1) Family (TC# 1.A.76) is a group of magnesium transporters that are part of the TOG superfamily. Goytain and Quamme identified a Mg^{2+}-related transporter whose expression or function was affected by an implantation-associated protein precursor. They designated this protein, MagT1. MagT1 is expressed as a 335 amino acid polypeptide which includes five transmembrane helices. The nascent polypeptide possesses a cleavage site after the N-terminal signal sequence helix, rendering a mature MagT1 protein with four transmembrane helices. MagT1 additionally contains a number of phosphorylation sites.

Recent evidence demonstrates that the primary function of MagT1 is protein glycosylation, mediated by MagT1's function as a component of the oligosaccharyltransferase (OST).

== Function ==
When expressed in Xenopus laevis oocytes, MagT1 mediates saturable Mg^{2+} uptake with a K_{m} of 0.23 mM. Transport of Mg^{2+} by MagT1 is rheogenic, voltage-dependent, and does not display time-dependent inactivation. Transport is specific to Mg^{2+}_{,} as other divalent cations do not evoke currents. Large external concentrations of some cations inhibited Mg^{2+} transport (Ni^{2+}, Zn^{2+}, Mn^{2+}) in MagT1-expressing oocytes although Ca^{2+}and Fe^{2+} were without effect. MagT1 has an N-terminal thioredoxin domain of unknown function.

Zhou and Clapham identified two mammalian genes, MagT1 and TUSC3, catalyzing Mg^{2+} influx. MagT1 is universally expressed in all human tissues, and its expression level is upregulated in low extracellular Mg^{2+}. Knockdown of either MagT1 or TUSC3 protein lowered the total and free intracellular Mg^{2+}concentrations in mammalian cell lines. Morpholino knockdown of MagT1 and TUSC3 protein expression in zebrafish embryos resulted in early developmental arrest; excess Mg^{2+} or supplementation with mammalian mRNAs rescued these effects. Thus, MagT1 and TUSC3 are vertebrate plasma membrane Mg^{2+} transport system.

== Transport reaction ==
The reaction catalyzed by MagT1, or a potential downstream glycosylation target (e.g. a Mg^{2+} transporter), is:

Mg^{2+} (out) → Mg^{2+} (in)

== Role in magnesium deficiency ==
The identification of genetic changes and their functional consequences in patients with immunodeficiency resulting from loss of MAGT1 revealed that magnesium and MagT1 are key molecular players for T cell-mediated immune responses. This led to the description of XMEN (X-linked immunodeficiency with magnesium defect, Epstein-Barr Virus infection, and neoplasia) syndrome, for which Mg^{2+} supplementation has been shown to be beneficial. Similarly, the identification of copy-number variation leading to dysfunctional MAGT1 in a family with atypical ATR-X syndrome and skin abnormalities, suggested that the MAGT1 defect is responsible for the cutaneous problems.

== Role in protein glycosylation ==
MagT1 and its homologue TUSC3 are both bona fide components of the oligosaccharyltransferase (OST).
