= Sodium-dependent phosphate transport protein 2A =

Protein-coding gene in the species Homo sapiens

SLC34A1

Identifiers
- Aliases: SLC34A1, NPT2, NPTIIa, solute carrier family 34 member 1, NaPi-2a, HCINF2, SLC17A2, SLC11, NAPI-3, FRTS2, NPHLOP1
- External IDs: OMIM: 182309; MGI: 1345284; GeneCards: SLC34A1

Gene location (Human)
Chr.	Chromosome 5 (human)
Band	5q35.3	Start	177,379,235 bp
Band	5q35.3	End	177,398,848 bp

Gene location (Mouse)
Chr.	Chromosome 13 (mouse)
Band	13 B1|13 29.81 cM	Start	55,546,000 bp
Band	13 B1|13 29.81 cM	End	55,563,405 bp
RNA expression pattern
Bgee	Human / Mouse (ortholog); Top expressed in: kidney tubule; metanephric glomerulus; renal medulla; right lobe of liver; human kidney; granulocyte; blood; mucosa of esophagus; tonsil; zone of skin / Top expressed in: right kidney; human kidney; proximal tubule; clavicle; membranous bone; maxilla; mandible; lumbar subsegment of spinal cord; rib; primary visual cortex; More reference expression data
BioGPS	n/a
Gene ontology
Molecular function	protein homodimerization activity; protein binding; symporter activity; sodium:phosphate symporter activity; PDZ domain binding; protein-containing complex binding
Cellular component	integral component of membrane; endosome; membrane; intrinsic component of plasma membrane; integral component of plasma membrane; cell surface; brush border membrane; perinuclear region of cytoplasm; membrane raft; vesicle; brush border; cytoplasm; plasma membrane; apical plasma membrane; nuclear speck; mitotic spindle
Biological process	phosphate ion transport; response to potassium ion; response to estradiol; cellular response to staurosporine; glycoprotein metabolic process; response to cadmium ion; ossification; sodium-dependent phosphate transport; positive regulation of phosphate transmembrane transport; kidney development; response to nutrient; sodium ion transport; response to thyroid hormone; response to peptide hormone; phosphate ion homeostasis; response to magnesium ion; dentinogenesis; response to peptide; response to vitamin A; indole metabolic process; cellular response to metal ion; response to parathyroid hormone; response to lead ion; tricarboxylic acid metabolic process; gentamycin metabolic process; response to growth hormone; arsenate ion transmembrane transport; response to mercury ion; cellular response to parathyroid hormone stimulus; positive regulation of sodium-dependent phosphate transport; positive regulation of membrane potential; protein homooligomerization; cellular phosphate ion homeostasis; sodium ion transmembrane transport; ion transport; phosphate ion transmembrane transport; sodium ion import across plasma membrane
Sources:Amigo / QuickGO
Orthologs
Databases	NCBI: entry; OMA: entry
Species	Human	Mouse
Entrez	6569	20505
Ensembl	ENSG00000131183	ENSMUSG00000021490
UniProt	Q06495; Q7Z725	Q60825; Q9D2V6
RefSeq (mRNA)	NM_001167579; NM_003052	NM_011392
RefSeq (protein)	NP_001161051; NP_003043; NP_003043.3	NP_035522
Location (UCSC)	Chr 5: 177.38 – 177.4 Mb	Chr 13: 55.55 – 55.56 Mb
PubMed search
- Wikidata
View/Edit Human	View/Edit Mouse

Sodium-dependent phosphate transport protein 2A, also known as Na^{+}-P_{i} cotransporter 2a (NaPi-2a), is a protein in humans that is encoded by the SLC34A1 gene. This gene encodes a member of the type II sodium-phosphate cotransporter family.

== Function ==
The sodium/phosphate cotransporter is a protein found in the proximal tubule of the nephron. It is responsible for reabsorbing approximately 80% of the phosphate that has been filtered out at the glomerulus. The transporter moves hydrogen phosphate (HPO_{4}^{2−}) into the cell along with 3 sodium ions. Alternatively it can move dihydrogen phosphate (H_{2}PO_{4}^{−} along with 2 sodium ions. For both movements the net charge is +1. Once inside the cell hydrogen phosphate and dihydrogen phosphate may react with water to form each other. Transport of these chemicals out of the cell at the basolateral surface is not understood currently.

The NaPi channels are regulated by parathyroid hormone (PTH). PTH acts to decrease phosphate reabsorption from the renal filtrate and therefore promote its excretion into the urine. It does this by causing endocytosis of NaPi transporters on the apical surface of the cell. With less transporter available more phosphate is lost in the urine.

== Clinical significance ==
Mutations in this gene are associated with hypophosphatemia nephrolithiasis/osteoporosis 1.

== See also ==
- Renal physiology
- Cotransporter
- Co-transport
- P-loop
- Solute carrier (SLC) family
