= Cysteamine =

Chemical compound

Cysteamine INN: mercaptamine
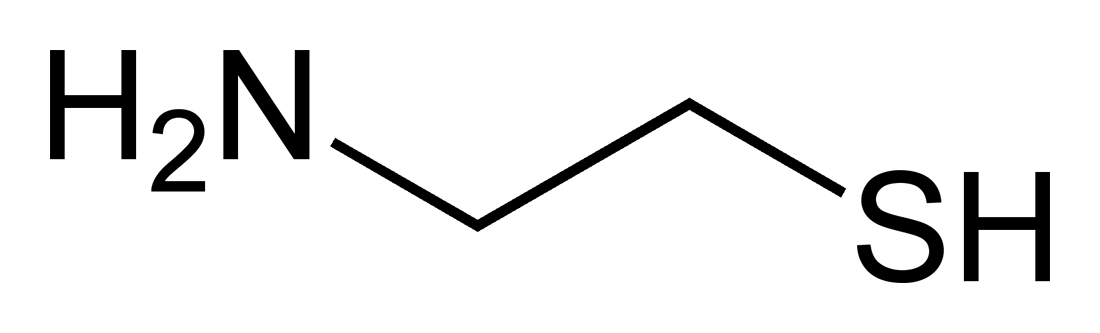

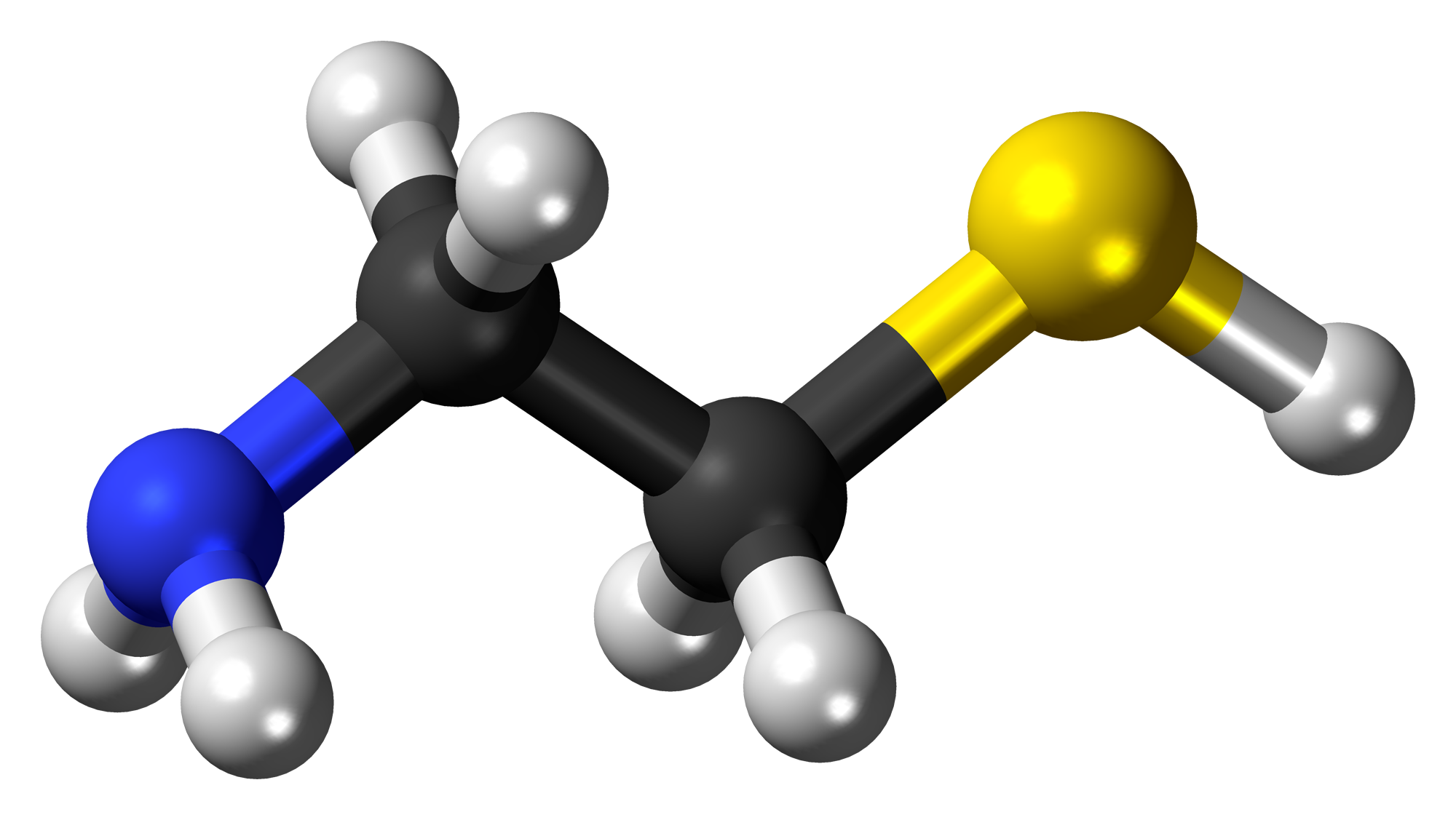
- Skeletal formula (top); Ball-and-stick model of the cysteamine

Clinical data
- Trade names: Cystagon, Procysbi, Cystaran, others
- Other names: 2-Aminoethanethiol, β-Mercaptoethylamine, 2-Mercaptoethylamine, decarboxycysteine, thioethanolamine, mercaptamine bitartrate, cysteamine (USAN US)
- AHFS/Drugs.com: Micromedex Detailed Consumer Information
- License data: US DailyMed: Cysteamine
- Pregnancy category: AU: B3
- Routes of administration: By mouth, eye drops
- ATC code: A16AA04 (WHO) S01XA21 (WHO)

Legal status
- Legal status: CA: ℞-only; UK: POM (Prescription only); US: ℞-only; EU: Rx-only; In general: ℞ (Prescription only)

Identifiers
- IUPAC name: 2-Aminoethane-1-thiol
- CAS Number: 60-23-1
- PubChem CID: 6058
- IUPHAR/BPS: 7440
- DrugBank: DB00847
- ChemSpider: 5834
- UNII: 5UX2SD1KE2
- KEGG: D03634; as salt: D10468
- ChEBI: CHEBI:17141
- ChEMBL: ChEMBL602
- PDB ligand: DHL (PDBe, RCSB PDB)
- CompTox Dashboard (EPA): DTXSID3022875
- ECHA InfoCard: 100.000.421

Chemical and physical data
- Formula: C_{2}H_{7}NS
- Molar mass: 77.15 g·mol^{−1}
- 3D model (JSmol): Interactive image
- Melting point: 95 to 97 °C (203 to 207 °F)
- SMILES: C(CS)N
- InChI: InChI=1S/C2H7NS/c3-1-2-4/h4H,1-3H2; Key:UFULAYFCSOUIOV-UHFFFAOYSA-N

Cysteamine is an organosulfur compound with the formula HSCH_{2}CH_{2}NH_{2}. A white, water-soluble solid, it contains both an amine and a thiol functional group. It is often used as the salt of the ammonium derivative [HSCH_{2}CH_{2}NH_{3}]^{+}, including the hydrochloride, and the bitartrate. Another derivative is phosphocysteamine, H_{3}NCH_{2}CH_{2}SPO_{3}Na. The intermediate pantetheine is broken down into cysteamine and pantothenic acid.

It is biosynthesized in mammals, including humans, by the degradation of coenzyme A. It is the biosynthetic precursor to the neurotransmitter hypotaurine.

== Medical uses ==
As a medication sold under the brand names Procysbi or Cystagon, among others, cysteamine is indicated to treat cystinosis, a lysosomal storage disease characterized by the abnormal accumulation of cystine, the oxidized dimer of the amino acid cysteine. It removes the excessive cystine that builds up in cells of people with the disease. Cysteamine functions by the following chemical reaction converting the disulfide cystine to a more soluble mixed disulfide and cysteine, both of which are more soluble than cystine.

(SCH_{2}CH(NH_{3})CO^{−}_{2})_{2} + HSCH_{2}CH_{2}NH_{2} → H_{2}NCH_{2}CH_{2}SSCH_{2}CH(NH_{3})CO^{−}_{2} + HSCH_{2}CH(NH_{3})CO^{−}_{2}

It is available by mouth (capsule and extended release capsule) and in eye drops.

When applied topically, it can lighten skin darkened by post-inflammatory hyperpigmentation, sun exposure or melasma.

== Adverse effects ==
The label for oral formulations of cysteamine carries warnings about symptoms similar to Ehlers–Danlos syndrome, severe skin rashes, ulcers or bleeding in the stomach and intestines, central nervous symptoms including seizures, lethargy, somnolence, depression, and encephalopathy, low white blood cell levels, elevated alkaline phosphatase, and idiopathic intracranial hypertension that can cause headache, tinnitus, dizziness, nausea, double or blurry vision, loss of vision, and pain behind the eye or pain with eye movement.

Additional adverse effects of oral cysteamine include bad breath, skin odor, vomiting, nausea, stomach pain, diarrhea, and loss of appetite.

For eye drops, the most common adverse effects are sensitivity to light, redness, and eye pain, headache, and visual field defects.

== Interactions ==
There are no drug interactions for normal capsules or eye drops, but the extended release capsules should not be taken with drugs that affect stomach acid like proton pump inhibitors or with alcohol, as they can cause the drug to be released too quickly. It does not inhibit any cytochrome P450 enzymes.

== Pharmacology ==
People with cystinosis lack a functioning transporter (cystinosin) which transports cystine from the lysosome to the cytosol. This ultimately leads to the buildup of cystine in lysosomes, where it crystallizes and damages cells. Cysteamine enters lysosomes and converts cystine into cysteine and cysteine-cysteamine mixed disulfide, both of which can exit the lysosome. Cysteamine also promotes the transport of L-cysteine into cells.

== History ==
The therapeutic effect of cysteamine on cystinosis was reported in the 1950s. Cysteamine was approved as a drug for cystinosis in the US in 1994. An extended release form was approved in 2013.
