= Cystine =

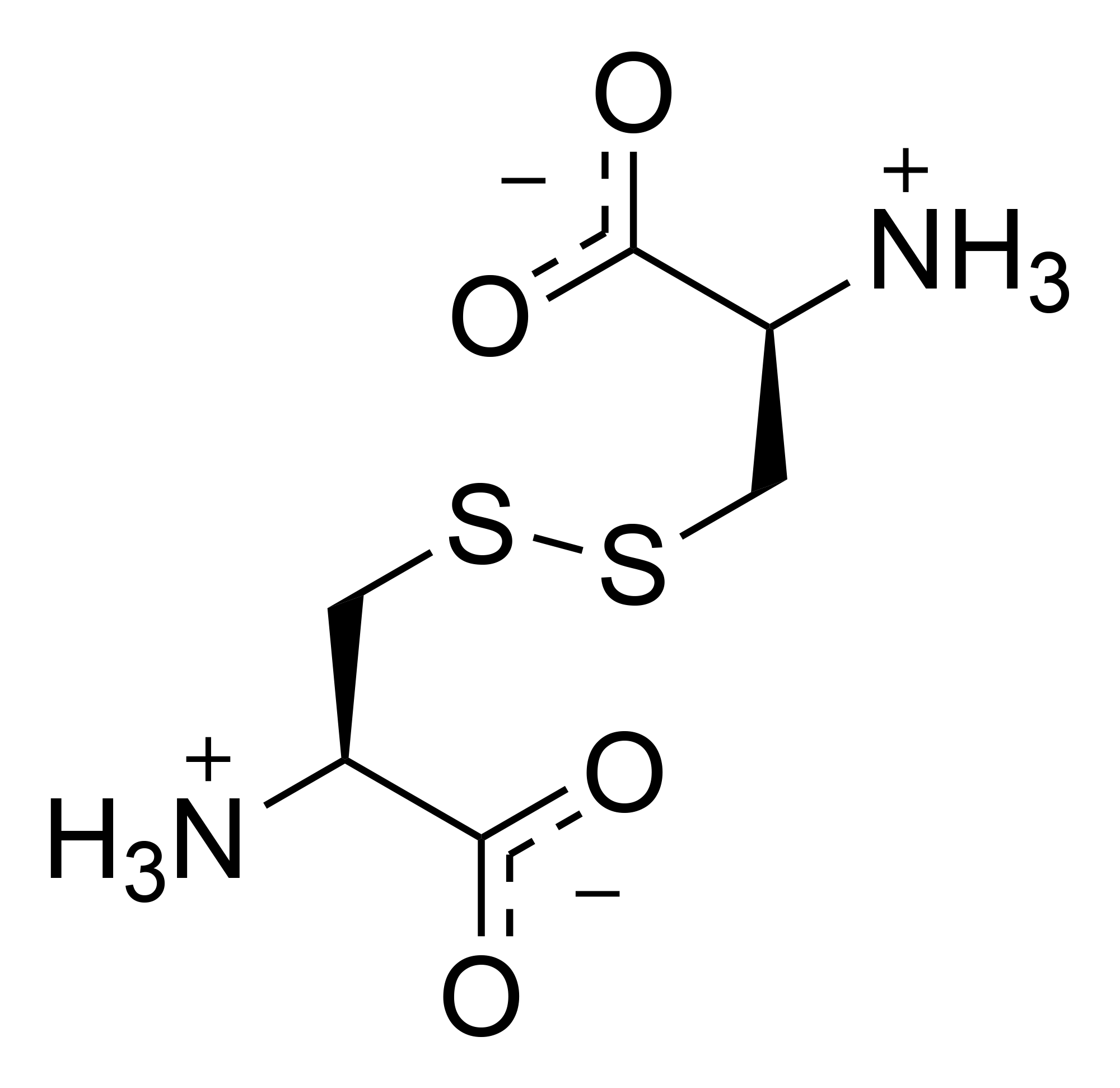

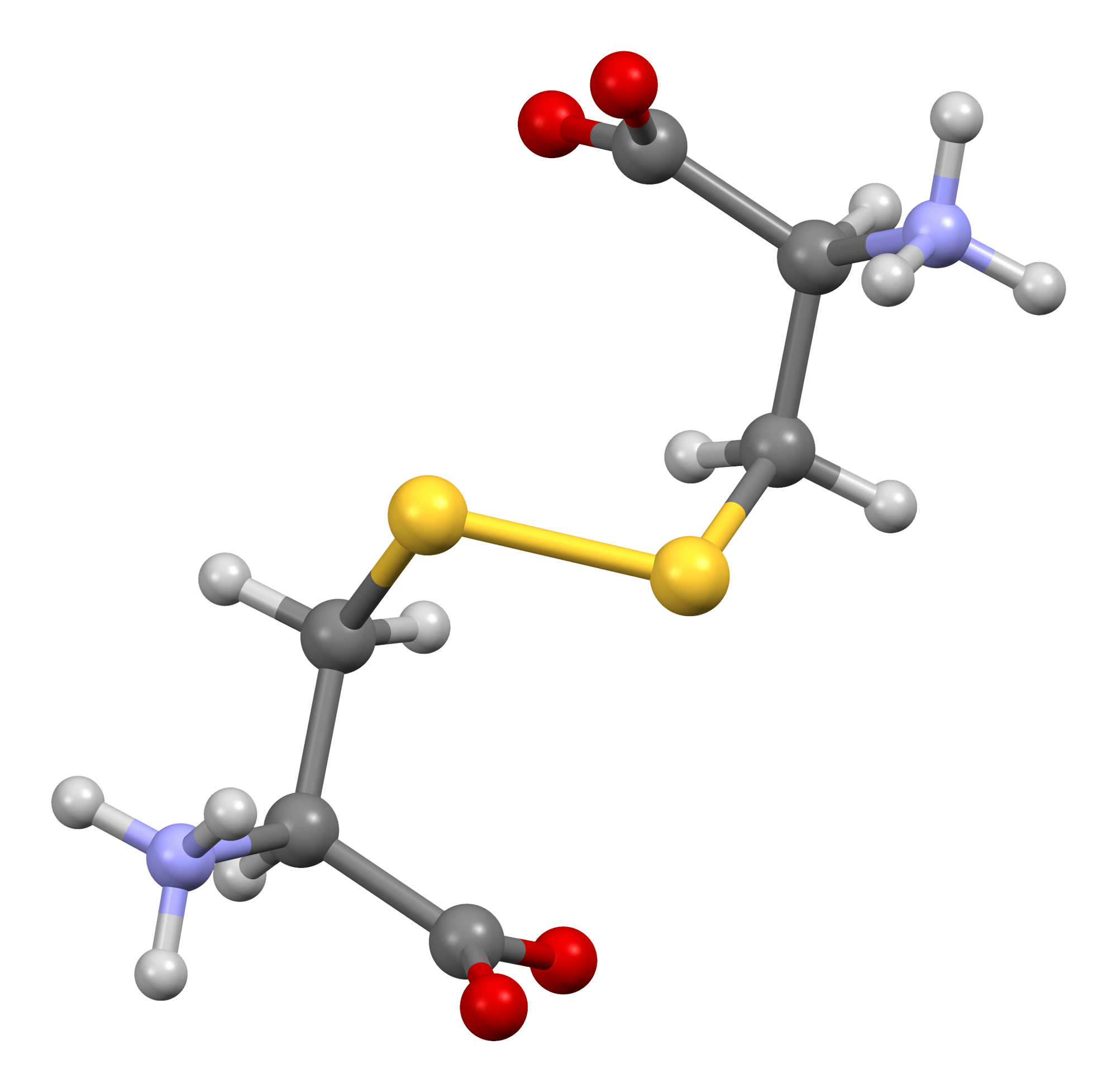

Names
- IUPAC name 3,3'-Disulfanediylbis(2-ammoniopropanoate)

Identifiers
CAS Number	56-89-3
3D model (JSmol)	Interactive image
ChEBI	CHEBI:35492
ChEMBL	ChEMBL366563
ChemSpider	575
ECHA InfoCard	100.000.270
IUPHAR/BPS	5413
KEGG	C01420
PubChem CID	67678
UNII	48TCX9A1VT
CompTox Dashboard (EPA)	DTXSID2046418
- InChI: InChI=1S/C6H12N2O4S2/c7-3(5(9)10)1-13-14-2-4(8)6(11)12/h3-4H,1-2,7-8H2,(H,9,10)(H,11,12) Key: LEVWYRKDKASIDU-UHFFFAOYSA-N; InChI=1/C6H12N2O4S2/c7-3(5(9)10)1-13-14-2-4(8)6(11)12/h3-4H,1-2,7-8H2,(H,9,10)(H,11,12) Key: LEVWYRKDKASIDU-UHFFFAOYAA
- SMILES: C(C(C(=O)O)N)SSCC(C(=O)O)N

Properties
Chemical formula	C_{6}H_{12}N_{2}O_{4}S_{2}
Molar mass	240.29 g·mol^{−1}

Hazards
Safety data sheet (SDS)	External MSDS
- Except where otherwise noted, data are given for materials in their standard state (at 25 °C [77 °F], 100 kPa). verify (what is ?) Infobox references

Cystine is the oxidized dimeric derivative of the amino acid cysteine and has the formula (SCH_{2}CH(NH_{2})CO_{2}H)_{2}. It is a white solid that is poorly soluble in water. As a residue in proteins, cystine serves two functions: a site of redox reactions and a mechanical linkage that allows proteins to retain their three-dimensional structure.

== Formation and reactions ==
=== Structure ===
Cystine is the disulfide derived from the amino acid cysteine. The conversion can be viewed as an oxidation:

2 HO_{2}CCH(NH_{2})CH_{2}SH + 0.5 O_{2} → (HO_{2}CCH(NH_{2})CH_{2}S)_{2} + H_{2}O

Cystine contains a disulfide bond, two amine groups, and two carboxylic acid groups. As for other amino acids, the amine and carboxylic acid groups exist in rapid equilibrium with the ammonium-carboxylate tautomer. The great majority of the literature concerns l,l-cystine, derived from l-cysteine. Other isomers include d,d-cystine and the meso isomer d,l-cystine, neither of which is biologically significant.

=== Occurrence ===
Cystine is common in many foods such as eggs, meat, dairy products, and whole grains as well as skin, horns and hair. It was not recognized as being derived of proteins until it was isolated from the horn of a cow in 1899. Human hair and skin contain approximately 10–14% cystine by mass.

=== History ===
Cystine was discovered in 1810 by the English chemist William Hyde Wollaston, who called it "cystic oxide". In 1833, the Swedish chemist Jöns Jacob Berzelius named the amino acid "cystine". The Norwegian chemist Christian J. Thaulow determined, in 1838, the empirical formula of cystine. In 1884, the German chemist Eugen Baumann found that when cystine was treated with a reducing agent, cystine revealed itself to be a dimer of a monomer which he named "cysteïne". In 1899, cystine was first isolated from protein (horn tissue) by the Swedish chemist Karl A. H. Mörner (1855-1917). The chemical structure of cystine was determined by synthesis in 1903 by the German chemist Emil Erlenmeyer.

The history of cystine and cysteine is complicated by the dimer-monomer relationship of the two. The cysteine monomer was proposed as the actual unit by Gustav Embden in 1901.

The sulfur within the structure of cysteine and cystine has been subject of historical interest. In 1902, Carl Osborne partially succeeded in analysing cystine content via lead compounds. An improved colorimetric method was developed in 1922 by Otto Folin and Joseph Looney. An iodometric analysis method was developed by Y Okuda in 1925.

=== Redox ===
It is formed from the oxidation of two cysteine molecules, which results in the formation of a disulfide bond. In cell biology, cystine residues (found in proteins) only exist in non-reductive (oxidative) organelles, such as the secretory pathway (endoplasmic reticulum, Golgi apparatus, lysosomes, and vesicles) and extracellular spaces (e.g., extracellular matrix). Under reductive conditions (in the cytoplasm, nucleus, etc.) cysteine is predominant. The disulfide link is readily reduced to give the corresponding thiol cysteine. Typical thiols for this reaction are mercaptoethanol and dithiothreitol:

(SCH_{2}CH(NH_{2})CO_{2}H)_{2} + 2 RSH → 2 HSCH_{2}CH(NH_{2})CO_{2}H + RSSR

Because of the facility of the thiol-disulfide exchange, the nutritional benefits and sources of cystine are identical to those for the more-common cysteine. Disulfide bonds cleave more rapidly at higher temperatures.

=== Cystine-based disorders ===
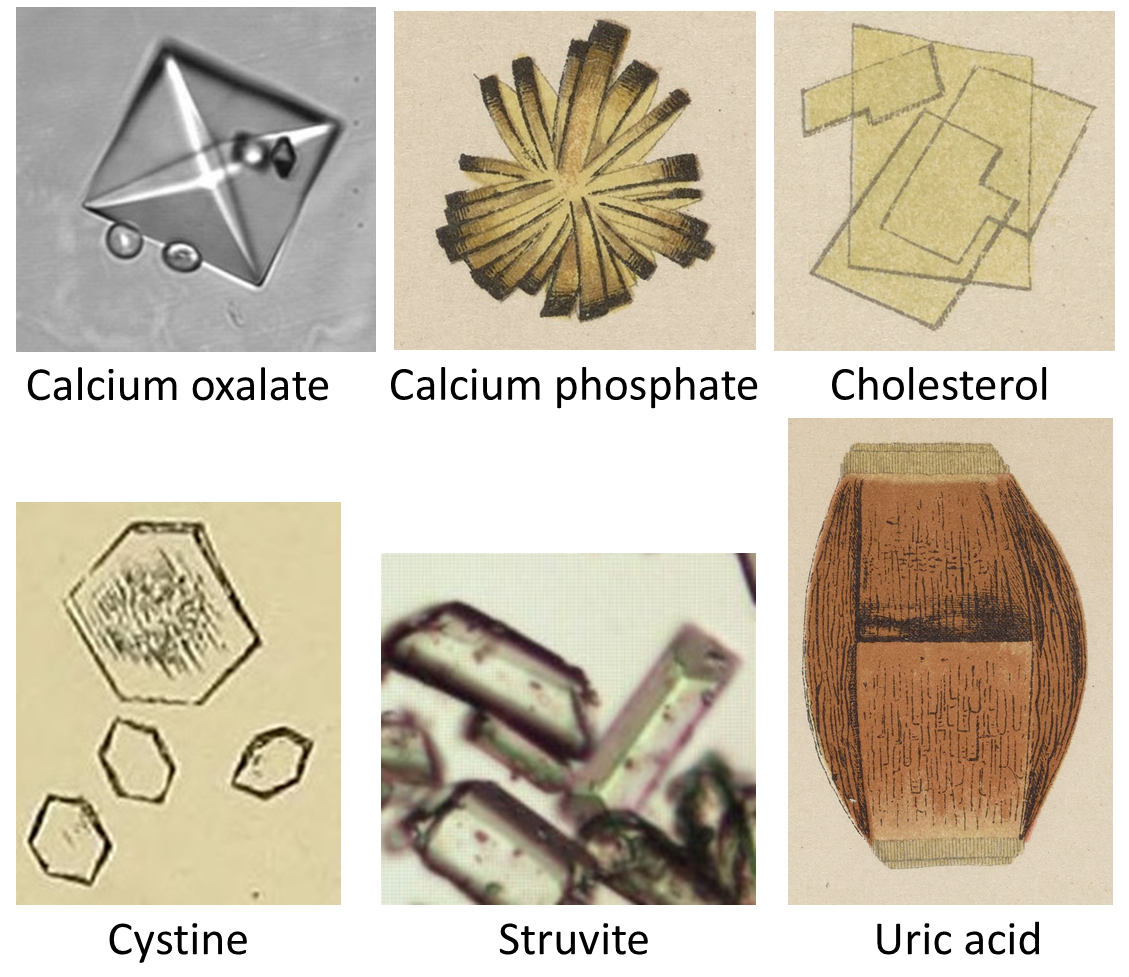
Selection of urinary crystals

The presence of cystine in urine is often indicative of amino acid reabsorption defects. Cystinuria has been reported to occur in dogs. In humans the excretion of high levels of cystine crystals can be indicative of cystinosis, a rare genetic disease. Cystine stones account for about 1-2% of kidney stone disease in adults.

Various derivatives of cysteamine are used to address cystinosis. These derivatives convert poorly soluble cystine into more soluble derivatives.

== Biological transport ==
Cystine serves as a substrate for the cystine-glutamate antiporter. This transport system, which is highly specific for cystine and glutamate, increases the concentration of cystine inside the cell. In this system, the anionic form of cystine is transported in exchange for glutamate. Cystine is quickly reduced to cysteine. Cysteine prodrugs, e.g. acetylcysteine, induce release of glutamate into the extracellular space.

== See also ==
- Lanthionine, similar with mono-sulfide link
- Protein tertiary structure
- Sullivan reaction
- Cystinosis
