= List of MeSH codes (D12.776.157) =

The following is a partial list of the "D" codes for Medical Subject Headings (MeSH), as defined by the United States National Library of Medicine (NLM).

This list covers carrier proteins. For other protein-related codes, see List of MeSH codes (D12.776).

Codes before these are found at List of MeSH codes (D12.776.124). Codes following these are found at List of MeSH codes (D12.776) § MeSH D12.776.167. For other MeSH codes, see List of MeSH codes.

The source for this content is the set of 2006 MeSH Trees from the NLM.

== MeSH D12.776.157 – carrier proteins ==
=== MeSH D12.776.157.057 – adaptor proteins, signal transducing ===
==== MeSH D12.776.157.057.030 – interferon regulatory factors ====
- MeSH D12.776.157.057.030.124 – interferon regulatory factor-1
- MeSH D12.776.157.057.030.249 – interferon regulatory factor-2
- MeSH D12.776.157.057.030.374 – interferon regulatory factor-3
- MeSH D12.776.157.057.030.437 – interferon regulatory factor-7
- MeSH D12.776.157.057.030.500 – interferon-stimulated gene factor 3, gamma subunit

==== MeSH D12.776.157.057.061 – interferon-stimulated gene factor 3 ====
- MeSH D12.776.157.057.061.500 – interferon-stimulated gene factor 3, alpha subunit
- MeSH D12.776.157.057.061.500.500 – stat1 transcription factor
- MeSH D12.776.157.057.061.500.750 – stat2 transcription factor
- MeSH D12.776.157.057.061.750 – interferon-stimulated gene factor 3, gamma subunit

==== MeSH D12.776.157.057.170 – smad proteins ====
- MeSH D12.776.157.057.170.249 – smad proteins, inhibitory
- MeSH D12.776.157.057.170.249.600 – smad6 protein
- MeSH D12.776.157.057.170.249.700 – smad7 protein
- MeSH D12.776.157.057.170.500 – smad proteins, receptor-regulated
- MeSH D12.776.157.057.170.500.100 – smad1 protein
- MeSH D12.776.157.057.170.500.200 – smad2 protein
- MeSH D12.776.157.057.170.500.300 – smad3 protein
- MeSH D12.776.157.057.170.500.500 – smad5 protein
- MeSH D12.776.157.057.170.500.800 – smad8 protein
- MeSH D12.776.157.057.170.750 – smad4 protein

==== MeSH D12.776.157.057.186 – stat transcription factors ====
- MeSH D12.776.157.057.186.100 – stat1 transcription factor
- MeSH D12.776.157.057.186.200 – stat2 transcription factor
- MeSH D12.776.157.057.186.300 – stat3 transcription factor
- MeSH D12.776.157.057.186.400 – stat4 transcription factor
- MeSH D12.776.157.057.186.500 – stat5 transcription factor
- MeSH D12.776.157.057.186.600 – stat6 transcription factor

==== MeSH D12.776.157.057.500 – tumor necrosis factor receptor-associated peptides and proteins ====
- MeSH D12.776.157.057.500.500 – tnf receptor-associated factor 1
- MeSH D12.776.157.057.500.750 – tnf receptor-associated factor 2
- MeSH D12.776.157.057.500.875 – tnf receptor-associated factor 3
- MeSH D12.776.157.057.500.937 – tnf receptor-associated factor 5
- MeSH D12.776.157.057.500.968 – tnf receptor-associated factor 6

=== MeSH D12.776.157.125 – calcium-binding proteins ===
==== MeSH D12.776.157.125.050 – annexins ====
- MeSH D12.776.157.125.050.050 – annexin a1
- MeSH D12.776.157.125.050.060 – annexin a2
- MeSH D12.776.157.125.050.070 – Annexin A3
- MeSH D12.776.157.125.050.080 – annexin a4
- MeSH D12.776.157.125.050.100 – annexin a5
- MeSH D12.776.157.125.050.110 – annexin a6
- MeSH D12.776.157.125.050.120 – annexin a7

==== MeSH D12.776.157.125.412 – intracellular calcium-sensing proteins ====
- MeSH D12.776.157.125.412.249 – calmodulin
- MeSH D12.776.157.125.412.311 – calnexin
- MeSH D12.776.157.125.412.374 – calreticulin
- MeSH D12.776.157.125.412.437 – gelsolin
- MeSH D12.776.157.125.412.500 – neuronal calcium-sensor proteins
- MeSH D12.776.157.125.412.500.124 – guanylate cyclase-activating proteins
- MeSH D12.776.157.125.412.500.249 – hippocalcin
- MeSH D12.776.157.125.412.500.374 – Kv channel-interacting proteins
- MeSH D12.776.157.125.412.500.500 – neurocalcin
- MeSH D12.776.157.125.412.500.750 – recoverin

==== MeSH D12.776.157.125.750 – s100 proteins ====
- MeSH D12.776.157.125.750.500 – leukocyte L1 antigen complex
- MeSH D12.776.157.125.750.500.100 – calgranulin a
- MeSH D12.776.157.125.750.500.200 – calgranulin b

==== MeSH D12.776.157.125.825 – synaptotagmins ====
- MeSH D12.776.157.125.825.249 – synaptotagmin i
- MeSH D12.776.157.125.825.500 – synaptotagmin ii

=== MeSH D12.776.157.325 – gtp-binding proteins ===
==== MeSH D12.776.157.325.150 – gtp phosphohydrolase-linked elongation factors ====
- MeSH D12.776.157.325.150.200 – peptide elongation factor g
- MeSH D12.776.157.325.150.700 – peptide elongation factor tu
- MeSH D12.776.157.325.150.800 – peptide elongation factor 1
- MeSH D12.776.157.325.150.850 – peptide elongation factor 2

==== MeSH D12.776.157.325.332 – heterotrimeric gtp-binding proteins ====
- MeSH D12.776.157.325.332.100 – gtp-binding protein alpha subunits
- MeSH D12.776.157.325.332.100.100 – gtp-binding protein alpha subunits, g12-g13
- MeSH D12.776.157.325.332.100.200 – gtp-binding protein alpha subunits, gi-go
- MeSH D12.776.157.325.332.100.200.500 – gtp-binding protein alpha subunit, gi2
- MeSH D12.776.157.325.332.100.300 – gtp-binding protein alpha subunits, gq-g11
- MeSH D12.776.157.325.332.100.400 – gtp-binding protein alpha subunits, gs
- MeSH D12.776.157.325.332.520 – gtp-binding protein beta subunits
- MeSH D12.776.157.325.332.730 – gtp-binding protein gamma subunits
- MeSH D12.776.157.325.332.940 – transducin

==== MeSH D12.776.157.325.515 – monomeric gtp-binding proteins ====
- MeSH D12.776.157.325.515.100 – adp-ribosylation factors
- MeSH D12.776.157.325.515.100.100 – adp-ribosylation factor 1
- MeSH D12.776.157.325.515.400 – rab gtp-binding proteins
- MeSH D12.776.157.325.515.400.025 – rab1 gtp-binding proteins
- MeSH D12.776.157.325.515.400.050 – rab2 gtp-binding protein
- MeSH D12.776.157.325.515.400.100 – rab3 gtp-binding proteins
- MeSH D12.776.157.325.515.400.100.100 – rab3a gtp-binding protein
- MeSH D12.776.157.325.515.400.150 – rab4 gtp-binding proteins
- MeSH D12.776.157.325.515.400.200 – rab5 gtp-binding proteins
- MeSH D12.776.157.325.515.450 – ral gtp-binding proteins
- MeSH D12.776.157.325.515.462 – ran gtp-binding protein
- MeSH D12.776.157.325.515.475 – rap gtp-binding proteins
- MeSH D12.776.157.325.515.475.100 – rap1 gtp-binding proteins
- MeSH D12.776.157.325.515.500 – ras proteins
- MeSH D12.776.157.325.515.500.300 – oncogene protein p21(ras)
- MeSH D12.776.157.325.515.500.600 – proto-oncogene proteins p21(ras)
- MeSH D12.776.157.325.515.700 – rho gtp-binding proteins
- MeSH D12.776.157.325.515.700.050 – cdc42 gtp-binding protein
- MeSH D12.776.157.325.515.700.050.500 – cdc42 gtp-binding protein, saccharomyces cerevisiae
- MeSH D12.776.157.325.515.700.100 – rac gtp-binding proteins
- MeSH D12.776.157.325.515.700.100.100 – rac1 gtp-binding protein
- MeSH D12.776.157.325.515.700.200 – rhoa gtp-binding protein
- MeSH D12.776.157.325.515.700.300 – rhob gtp-binding protein

=== MeSH D12.776.157.427 – iron-binding proteins ===
==== MeSH D12.776.157.427.249 – ferritin ====
- MeSH D12.776.157.427.249.290 – apoferritin

==== MeSH D12.776.157.427.374 – nonheme iron proteins ====
- MeSH D12.776.157.427.374.187 – hemerythrin
- MeSH D12.776.157.427.374.375 – iron-sulfur proteins
- MeSH D12.776.157.427.374.375.025 – adrenodoxin
- MeSH D12.776.157.427.374.375.150 – ferredoxin-nitrite reductase
- MeSH D12.776.157.427.374.375.275 – ferredoxins
- MeSH D12.776.157.427.374.375.275.450 – molybdoferredoxin
- MeSH D12.776.157.427.374.375.275.725 – rubredoxins
- MeSH D12.776.157.427.374.375.637 – iron regulatory protein 1
- MeSH D12.776.157.427.374.375.818 – iron regulatory protein 2
- MeSH D12.776.157.427.374.375.863 – electron transport complex i
- MeSH D12.776.157.427.374.375.863.500 – nadh dehydrogenase
- MeSH D12.776.157.427.374.375.909 – electron transport complex ii
- MeSH D12.776.157.427.374.375.909.500 – succinate dehydrogenase
- MeSH D12.776.157.427.374.375.954 – electron transport complex iii
- MeSH D12.776.157.427.374.375.977 – nitrate reductase (nad(p)h)
- MeSH D12.776.157.427.374.375.988 – nitrate reductase (nadph)

=== MeSH D12.776.157.530 – membrane transport proteins ===
==== MeSH D12.776.157.530.100 – atp-binding cassette transporters ====
- MeSH D12.776.157.530.100.304 – multidrug resistance-associated proteins
- MeSH D12.776.157.530.100.652 – p-glycoproteins
- MeSH D12.776.157.530.100.652.500 – p-glycoprotein

==== MeSH D12.776.157.530.200 – amino acid transport systems ====
- MeSH D12.776.157.530.200.249 – amino acid transport systems, acidic
- MeSH D12.776.157.530.200.249.500 – amino acid transport system x-ag
- MeSH D12.776.157.530.200.249.500.500 – glutamate plasma membrane transport proteins
- MeSH D12.776.157.530.200.249.500.500.500 – excitatory amino acid transporter 1
- MeSH D12.776.157.530.200.249.500.500.750 – excitatory amino acid transporter 2
- MeSH D12.776.157.530.200.249.500.500.875 – excitatory amino acid transporter 3
- MeSH D12.776.157.530.200.249.500.500.937 – excitatory amino acid transporter 4
- MeSH D12.776.157.530.200.249.500.500.968 – excitatory amino acid transporter 5
- MeSH D12.776.157.530.200.374 – amino acid transport systems, basic
- MeSH D12.776.157.530.200.374.600 – amino acid transport system y+
- MeSH D12.776.157.530.200.374.600.200 – cationic amino acid transporter 1
- MeSH D12.776.157.530.200.374.600.300 – cationic amino acid transporter 2
- MeSH D12.776.157.530.200.374.750 – amino acid transport system y+l
- MeSH D12.776.157.530.200.374.750.500 – antigens, cd98
- MeSH D12.776.157.530.200.374.750.500.250 – antigens, cd98 heavy chain
- MeSH D12.776.157.530.200.374.750.500.625 – antigens, cd98 light chains
- MeSH D12.776.157.530.200.500 – amino acid transport systems, neutral
- MeSH D12.776.157.530.200.500.100 – amino acid transport system a
- MeSH D12.776.157.530.200.500.200 – amino acid transport system asc
- MeSH D12.776.157.530.200.500.500 – amino acid transport system l
- MeSH D12.776.157.530.200.500.500.500 – antigens, cd98
- MeSH D12.776.157.530.200.500.500.500.250 – antigens, cd98 heavy chain
- MeSH D12.776.157.530.200.500.500.500.300 – antigens, cd98 light chains
- MeSH D12.776.157.530.200.500.500.500.300.500 – large neutral amino acid-transporter 1

==== MeSH D12.776.157.530.300 – fatty acid transport proteins ====
- MeSH D12.776.157.530.300.500 – antigens, cd36

==== MeSH D12.776.157.530.400 – ion channels ====
- MeSH D12.776.157.530.400.150 – calcium channels
- MeSH D12.776.157.530.400.150.400 – calcium channels, l-type
- MeSH D12.776.157.530.400.150.585 – calcium channels, n-type
- MeSH D12.776.157.530.400.150.585.792 – calcium channels, p-type
- MeSH D12.776.157.530.400.150.585.826 – calcium channels, q-type
- MeSH D12.776.157.530.400.150.585.867 – calcium channels, r-type
- MeSH D12.776.157.530.400.150.720 – calcium channels, t-type
- MeSH D12.776.157.530.400.150.800 – ryanodine receptor calcium release channel
- MeSH D12.776.157.530.400.150.900 – trpp cation channels
- MeSH D12.776.157.530.400.175 – chloride channels
- MeSH D12.776.157.530.400.175.125 – cystic fibrosis transmembrane conductance regulator
- MeSH D12.776.157.530.400.500 – porins
- MeSH D12.776.157.530.400.500.040 – aquaporins
- MeSH D12.776.157.530.400.500.040.249 – aquaglyceroporins
- MeSH D12.776.157.530.400.500.040.249.500 – aquaporin 3
- MeSH D12.776.157.530.400.500.040.249.750 – aquaporin 6
- MeSH D12.776.157.530.400.500.040.374 – aquaporin 1
- MeSH D12.776.157.530.400.500.040.437 – aquaporin 2
- MeSH D12.776.157.530.400.500.040.468 – aquaporin 4
- MeSH D12.776.157.530.400.500.040.484 – aquaporin 5
- MeSH D12.776.157.530.400.500.520 – voltage-dependent anion channels
- MeSH D12.776.157.530.400.500.520.500 – voltage-dependent anion channel 1
- MeSH D12.776.157.530.400.500.520.750 – voltage-dependent anion channel 2
- MeSH D12.776.157.530.400.600 – potassium channels
- MeSH D12.776.157.530.400.600.150 – potassium channels, calcium-activated
- MeSH D12.776.157.530.400.600.150.249 – intermediate-conductance calcium-activated potassium channels
- MeSH D12.776.157.530.400.600.150.500 – large-conductance calcium-activated potassium channels
- MeSH D12.776.157.530.400.600.150.500.500 – large-conductance calcium-activated potassium channel alpha subunits
- MeSH D12.776.157.530.400.600.150.500.750 – large-conductance calcium-activated potassium channel beta subunits
- MeSH D12.776.157.530.400.600.150.750 – small-conductance calcium-activated potassium channels
- MeSH D12.776.157.530.400.600.450 – potassium channels, inwardly rectifying
- MeSH D12.776.157.530.400.600.450.500 – g protein-coupled inwardly-rectifying potassium channels
- MeSH D12.776.157.530.400.600.850 – potassium channels, tandem pore domain
- MeSH D12.776.157.530.400.600.900 – potassium channels, voltage-gated
- MeSH D12.776.157.530.400.600.900.124 – delayed rectifier potassium channels
- MeSH D12.776.157.530.400.600.900.124.249 – kcnq potassium channels
- MeSH D12.776.157.530.400.600.900.124.249.500 – kcnq1 potassium channel
- MeSH D12.776.157.530.400.600.900.124.249.750 – kcnq2 potassium channel
- MeSH D12.776.157.530.400.600.900.124.249.875 – kcnq3 potassium channel
- MeSH D12.776.157.530.400.600.900.124.374 – kv1.5 potassium channel
- MeSH D12.776.157.530.400.600.900.124.500 – shab potassium channels
- MeSH D12.776.157.530.400.600.900.249 – ether-a-go-go potassium channels
- MeSH D12.776.157.530.400.600.900.500 – shaker superfamily of potassium channels
- MeSH D12.776.157.530.400.600.900.500.124 – kv1.1 potassium channel
- MeSH D12.776.157.530.400.600.900.500.186 – kv1.2 potassium channel
- MeSH D12.776.157.530.400.600.900.500.217 – kv1.3 potassium channel
- MeSH D12.776.157.530.400.600.900.500.233 – kv1.4 potassium channel
- MeSH D12.776.157.530.400.600.900.500.241 – kv1.5 potassium channel
- MeSH D12.776.157.530.400.600.900.500.245 – kv1.6 potassium channel
- MeSH D12.776.157.530.400.600.900.500.249 – shab potassium channels
- MeSH D12.776.157.530.400.600.900.500.625 – shal potassium channels
- MeSH D12.776.157.530.400.600.900.500.750 – shaw potassium channels
- MeSH D12.776.157.530.400.875 – sodium channels
- MeSH D12.776.157.530.400.901 – transient receptor potential channels
- MeSH D12.776.157.530.400.901.500 – trpc cation channels
- MeSH D12.776.157.530.400.901.555 – trpm cation channels
- MeSH D12.776.157.530.400.901.777 – trpp cation channels
- MeSH D12.776.157.530.400.901.888 – trpv cation channels

==== MeSH D12.776.157.530.450 – ion pumps ====
- MeSH D12.776.157.530.450.074 – anion transport proteins
- MeSH D12.776.157.530.450.074.249 – halorhodopsins
- MeSH D12.776.157.530.450.074.500 – organic anion transporters
- MeSH D12.776.157.530.450.074.500.199 – dicarboxylic acid transporters
- MeSH D12.776.157.530.450.074.500.400 – monocarboxylic acid transporters
- MeSH D12.776.157.530.450.074.500.500 – organic anion transporters, atp-dependent
- MeSH D12.776.157.530.450.074.500.500.500 – multidrug resistance-associated proteins
- MeSH D12.776.157.530.450.074.500.500.750 – p-glycoprotein
- MeSH D12.776.157.530.450.074.500.500.875 – p-glycoproteins
- MeSH D12.776.157.530.450.074.500.687 – organic anion transporters, sodium-dependent
- MeSH D12.776.157.530.450.074.500.781 – organic anion transporters, sodium-independent
- MeSH D12.776.157.530.450.074.500.781.500 – organic anion transport polypeptide c
- MeSH D12.776.157.530.450.074.500.781.750 – organic anion transport protein 1
- MeSH D12.776.157.530.450.074.750 – phosphate transport proteins
- MeSH D12.776.157.530.450.074.750.500 – proton-phosphate symporters
- MeSH D12.776.157.530.450.074.750.750 – sodium-phosphate cotransporter proteins
- MeSH D12.776.157.530.450.074.750.750.500 – sodium-phosphate cotransporter proteins, type i
- MeSH D12.776.157.530.450.074.750.750.750 – sodium-phosphate cotransporter proteins, type ii
- MeSH D12.776.157.530.450.074.750.750.750.124 – sodium-phosphate cotransporter proteins, type iia
- MeSH D12.776.157.530.450.074.750.750.750.249 – sodium-phosphate cotransporter proteins, type iib
- MeSH D12.776.157.530.450.074.750.750.750.500 – sodium-phosphate cotransporter proteins, type iic
- MeSH D12.776.157.530.450.074.750.750.875 – sodium-phosphate cotransporter proteins, type iii
- MeSH D12.776.157.530.450.162 – antiporters
- MeSH D12.776.157.530.450.162.110 – anion exchange protein 1, erythrocyte
- MeSH D12.776.157.530.450.162.193 – chloride-bicarbonate antiporters
- MeSH D12.776.157.530.450.162.193.500 – anion exchange protein 1, erythrocyte
- MeSH D12.776.157.530.450.162.276 – potassium-hydrogen antiporters
- MeSH D12.776.157.530.450.162.442 – sodium-calcium exchanger
- MeSH D12.776.157.530.450.162.775 – sodium-hydrogen antiporter
- MeSH D12.776.157.530.450.162.887 – vesicular neurotransmitter transport proteins
- MeSH D12.776.157.530.450.162.887.500 – vesicular biogenic amine transport proteins
- MeSH D12.776.157.530.450.162.887.500.249 – vesicular acetylcholine transport proteins
- MeSH D12.776.157.530.450.162.887.500.500 – vesicular monoamine transport proteins
- MeSH D12.776.157.530.450.162.887.625 – vesicular glutamate transport proteins
- MeSH D12.776.157.530.450.162.887.625.500 – vesicular glutamate transport protein 1
- MeSH D12.776.157.530.450.162.887.625.750 – vesicular glutamate transport protein 2
- MeSH D12.776.157.530.450.162.887.750 – vesicular inhibitory amino acid transport proteins
- MeSH D12.776.157.530.450.250 – cation transport proteins
- MeSH D12.776.157.530.450.250.500 – ca(2+)-transporting atpase
- MeSH D12.776.157.530.450.250.750 – na(+)-k(+)-exchanging atpase
- MeSH D12.776.157.530.450.250.812 – organic cation transport proteins
- MeSH D12.776.157.530.450.250.812.500 – organic cation transporter 1
- MeSH D12.776.157.530.450.250.875 – proton pumps
- MeSH D12.776.157.530.450.250.875.249 – bacteriorhodopsins
- MeSH D12.776.157.530.450.250.875.374 – inorganic pyrophosphatase
- MeSH D12.776.157.530.450.250.875.437 – electron transport complex i
- MeSH D12.776.157.530.450.250.875.468 – electron transport complex iii
- MeSH D12.776.157.530.450.250.875.484 – electron transport complex iv
- MeSH D12.776.157.530.450.250.875.492 – photosystem i protein complex
- MeSH D12.776.157.530.450.250.875.500 – proton-translocating atpases
- MeSH D12.776.157.530.450.250.875.500.249 – bacterial proton-translocating atpases
- MeSH D12.776.157.530.450.250.875.500.500 – chloroplast proton-translocating atpases
- MeSH D12.776.157.530.450.250.875.500.625 – h(+)-k(+)-exchanging atpase
- MeSH D12.776.157.530.450.250.875.500.750 – mitochondrial proton-translocating atpases
- MeSH D12.776.157.530.450.250.875.500.875 – vacuolar proton-translocating atpases
- MeSH D12.776.157.530.450.625 – symporters
- MeSH D12.776.157.530.450.625.124 – dopamine plasma membrane transport proteins
- MeSH D12.776.157.530.450.625.139 – gaba plasma membrane transport proteins
- MeSH D12.776.157.530.450.625.147 – glutamate plasma membrane transport proteins
- MeSH D12.776.157.530.450.625.147.500 – excitatory amino acid transporter 1
- MeSH D12.776.157.530.450.625.147.750 – excitatory amino acid transporter 2
- MeSH D12.776.157.530.450.625.147.875 – excitatory amino acid transporter 3
- MeSH D12.776.157.530.450.625.147.937 – excitatory amino acid transporter 4
- MeSH D12.776.157.530.450.625.147.968 – excitatory amino acid transporter 5
- MeSH D12.776.157.530.450.625.155 – glycine plasma membrane transport proteins
- MeSH D12.776.157.530.450.625.186 – norepinephrine plasma membrane transport proteins
- MeSH D12.776.157.530.450.625.249 – proton-phosphate symporters
- MeSH D12.776.157.530.450.625.311 – serotonin plasma membrane transport proteins
- MeSH D12.776.157.530.450.625.374 – sodium chloride symporters
- MeSH D12.776.157.530.450.625.437 – sodium-glucose transport proteins
- MeSH D12.776.157.530.450.625.437.500 – sodium-glucose transporter 1
- MeSH D12.776.157.530.450.625.437.750 – sodium-glucose transporter 2
- MeSH D12.776.157.530.450.625.500 – sodium-bicarbonate symporters
- MeSH D12.776.157.530.450.625.625 – sodium-phosphate cotransporter proteins
- MeSH D12.776.157.530.450.625.625.500 – sodium-phosphate cotransporter proteins, type i
- MeSH D12.776.157.530.450.625.625.750 – sodium-phosphate cotransporter proteins, type ii
- MeSH D12.776.157.530.450.625.625.750.124 – sodium-phosphate cotransporter proteins, type iia
- MeSH D12.776.157.530.450.625.625.750.249 – sodium-phosphate cotransporter proteins, type iib
- MeSH D12.776.157.530.450.625.625.750.500 – sodium-phosphate cotransporter proteins, type iic
- MeSH D12.776.157.530.450.625.625.875 – sodium-phosphate cotransporter proteins, type iii
- MeSH D12.776.157.530.450.625.750 – sodium-potassium-chloride symporters

==== MeSH D12.776.157.530.500 – monosaccharide transport proteins ====
- MeSH D12.776.157.530.500.500 – glucose transport proteins, facilitative
- MeSH D12.776.157.530.500.500.500 – glucose transporter type 1
- MeSH D12.776.157.530.500.500.750 – glucose transporter type 2
- MeSH D12.776.157.530.500.500.875 – glucose transporter type 3
- MeSH D12.776.157.530.500.500.937 – glucose transporter type 4
- MeSH D12.776.157.530.500.500.968 – glucose transporter type 5
- MeSH D12.776.157.530.500.750 – sodium-glucose transport proteins
- MeSH D12.776.157.530.500.750.500 – sodium-glucose transporter 1
- MeSH D12.776.157.530.500.750.750 – sodium-glucose transporter 2

==== MeSH D12.776.157.530.562 – neurotransmitter transport proteins ====
- MeSH D12.776.157.530.562.374 – plasma membrane neurotransmitter transport proteins
- MeSH D12.776.157.530.562.374.500 – catecholamine plasma membrane transport proteins
- MeSH D12.776.157.530.562.374.500.500 – dopamine plasma membrane transport proteins
- MeSH D12.776.157.530.562.374.500.750 – norepinephrine plasma membrane transport proteins
- MeSH D12.776.157.530.562.374.750 – gaba plasma membrane transport proteins
- MeSH D12.776.157.530.562.374.781 – glutamate plasma membrane transport proteins
- MeSH D12.776.157.530.562.374.781.500 – excitatory amino acid transporter 1
- MeSH D12.776.157.530.562.374.781.750 – excitatory amino acid transporter 2
- MeSH D12.776.157.530.562.374.781.781 – excitatory amino acid transporter 3
- MeSH D12.776.157.530.562.374.781.812 – excitatory amino acid transporter 4
- MeSH D12.776.157.530.562.374.781.875 – excitatory amino acid transporter 5
- MeSH D12.776.157.530.562.374.812 – glycine plasma membrane transport proteins
- MeSH D12.776.157.530.562.374.875 – serotonin plasma membrane transport proteins
- MeSH D12.776.157.530.562.750 – vesicular neurotransmitter transport proteins
- MeSH D12.776.157.530.562.750.500 – vesicular biogenic amine transport proteins
- MeSH D12.776.157.530.562.750.500.249 – vesicular acetylcholine transport proteins
- MeSH D12.776.157.530.562.750.500.500 – vesicular monoamine transport proteins
- MeSH D12.776.157.530.562.750.625 – vesicular glutamate transport proteins
- MeSH D12.776.157.530.562.750.625.500 – vesicular glutamate transport protein 1
- MeSH D12.776.157.530.562.750.625.750 – vesicular glutamate transport protein 2
- MeSH D12.776.157.530.562.750.750 – vesicular inhibitory amino acid transport proteins

==== MeSH D12.776.157.530.625 – nucleobase, nucleoside, nucleotide, and nucleic acid transport proteins ====
- MeSH D12.776.157.530.625.500 – nucleobase transport proteins
- MeSH D12.776.157.530.625.750 – nucleoside transport proteins
- MeSH D12.776.157.530.625.750.500 – equilibrative nucleoside transport proteins
- MeSH D12.776.157.530.625.750.500.500 – equilibrative nucleoside transporter 1
- MeSH D12.776.157.530.625.750.500.750 – equilibrative-nucleoside transporter 2
- MeSH D12.776.157.530.625.875 – nucleotide transport proteins
- MeSH D12.776.157.530.625.875.500 – mitochondrial adp, atp translocases
- MeSH D12.776.157.530.625.875.500.100 – adenine nucleotide translocator 1
- MeSH D12.776.157.530.625.875.500.200 – adenine nucleotide translocator 2
- MeSH D12.776.157.530.625.875.500.300 – adenine nucleotide translocator 3

==== MeSH D12.776.157.530.750 – nucleocytoplasmic transport proteins ====
- MeSH D12.776.157.530.750.100 – aryl hydrocarbon receptor nuclear translocator
- MeSH D12.776.157.530.750.200 – cellular apoptosis susceptibility protein
- MeSH D12.776.157.530.750.500 – karyopherins
- MeSH D12.776.157.530.750.500.100 – alpha karyopherins
- MeSH D12.776.157.530.750.500.249 – beta karyopherins
- MeSH D12.776.157.530.750.625 – nuclear pore complex proteins
- MeSH D12.776.157.530.750.750 – ran gtp-binding protein

=== MeSH D12.776.157.648 – phosphate-binding proteins ===
==== MeSH D12.776.157.648.500 – phosphate transport proteins ====
- MeSH D12.776.157.648.500.500 – proton-phosphate symporters
- MeSH D12.776.157.648.500.750 – sodium-phosphate cotransporter proteins
- MeSH D12.776.157.648.500.750.500 – sodium-phosphate cotransporter proteins, type i
- MeSH D12.776.157.648.500.750.750 – sodium-phosphate cotransporter proteins, type ii
- MeSH D12.776.157.648.500.750.750.124 – sodium-phosphate cotransporter proteins, type iia
- MeSH D12.776.157.648.500.750.750.249 – sodium-phosphate cotransporter proteins, type iib
- MeSH D12.776.157.648.500.750.750.500 – sodium-phosphate cotransporter proteins, type iic
- MeSH D12.776.157.648.500.750.875 – sodium-phosphate cotransporter proteins, type iii

=== MeSH D12.776.157.725 – RNA-binding proteins ===
==== MeSH D12.776.157.725.124 – mrna cleavage and polyadenylation factors ====
- MeSH D12.776.157.725.124.249 – cleavage stimulation factor
- MeSH D12.776.157.725.124.500 – cleavage and polyadenylation specificity factor

==== MeSH D12.776.157.725.444 – nuclear factor 90 proteins ====
- MeSH D12.776.157.725.444.500 – nuclear factor 45 protein

==== MeSH D12.776.157.725.452 – poly(a)-binding proteins ====
- MeSH D12.776.157.725.452.249 – poly(a)-binding protein i
- MeSH D12.776.157.725.452.500 – poly(a)-binding protein ii

==== MeSH D12.776.157.725.500 – ribonucleoproteins ====
- MeSH D12.776.157.725.500.500 – heterogeneous-nuclear ribonucleoproteins
- MeSH D12.776.157.725.500.500.100 – heterogeneous-nuclear ribonucleoprotein group a-b
- MeSH D12.776.157.725.500.500.200 – heterogeneous-nuclear ribonucleoprotein group c
- MeSH D12.776.157.725.500.500.300 – heterogeneous-nuclear ribonucleoprotein d
- MeSH D12.776.157.725.500.500.400 – heterogeneous-nuclear ribonucleoprotein group f-h
- MeSH D12.776.157.725.500.500.500 – heterogeneous-nuclear ribonucleoprotein k
- MeSH D12.776.157.725.500.500.600 – heterogeneous-nuclear ribonucleoprotein l
- MeSH D12.776.157.725.500.500.700 – heterogeneous-nuclear ribonucleoprotein group m
- MeSH D12.776.157.725.500.500.800 – heterogeneous-nuclear ribonucleoprotein u
- MeSH D12.776.157.725.500.500.900 – RNA-binding protein ews
- MeSH D12.776.157.725.500.500.905 – RNA-binding protein fus
- MeSH D12.776.157.725.500.625 – ribonuclease p
- MeSH D12.776.157.725.500.750 – ribonucleoproteins, small cytoplasmic
- MeSH D12.776.157.725.500.750.800 – signal recognition particle
- MeSH D12.776.157.725.500.875 – ribonucleoproteins, small nuclear
- MeSH D12.776.157.725.500.875.590 – ribonucleoproteins, small nucleolar
- MeSH D12.776.157.725.500.875.600 – ribonucleoprotein, u1 small nuclear
- MeSH D12.776.157.725.500.875.605 – ribonucleoprotein, u2 small nuclear
- MeSH D12.776.157.725.500.875.615 – ribonucleoprotein, u4-u6 small nuclear
- MeSH D12.776.157.725.500.875.620 – ribonucleoprotein, u5 small nuclear
- MeSH D12.776.157.725.500.875.625 – ribonucleoprotein, u7 small nuclear
- MeSH D12.776.157.725.500.906 – RNA-induced silencing complex
- MeSH D12.776.157.725.500.937 – vault ribonucleoprotein particles

==== MeSH D12.776.157.725.750 – rna cap-binding proteins ====
- MeSH D12.776.157.725.750.374 – eukaryotic initiation factor-4e
- MeSH D12.776.157.725.750.750 – nuclear cap-binding protein complex

=== MeSH D12.776.157.905 – transferrin-binding proteins ===
==== MeSH D12.776.157.905.500 – receptors, transferrin ====
- MeSH D12.776.157.905.500.249 – bacterial transferrin receptor complex
- MeSH D12.776.157.905.500.249.500 – transferrin-binding protein a
- MeSH D12.776.157.905.500.249.750 – transferrin-binding protein b

=== MeSH D12.776.157.920 – vitamin d-binding protein ===
The list continues at List of MeSH codes (D12.776) § MeSH D12.776.167.
