= Excitatory amino acid reuptake inhibitor =

Class of pharmaceutical compounds

An excitatory amino acid reuptake inhibitor (EAARI) is a type of drug which inhibits the reuptake of the excitatory neurotransmitters glutamate and aspartate by blocking one or more of the excitatory amino acid transporters (EAATs).

Examples of EAARIs include dihydrokainic acid (DHK) and WAY-213,613, selective blockers of EAAT2 (GLT-1), and L-trans-2,4-PDC, a non-selective blocker of all five EAATs. Amphetamine is a selective noncompetitive reuptake inhibitor of presynaptic EAAT3 (via transporter endocytosis) in dopamine neurons. L-Theanine is reported to competitively inhibit reuptake at EAAT1 (GLAST) and EAAT2 (GLT-1).

== See also ==
- Reuptake inhibitor
- Glutamatergic
- GABA reuptake inhibitor
- Glycine reuptake inhibitor
- Excitatory amino acid receptor agonist
- Excitatory amino acid receptor antagonist
