= Neurotransmitter transporter =

Class of membrane transport proteins

Neurotransmitter transporters are a class of membrane transport proteins that span the cellular membranes of neurons. Their primary function is to carry neurotransmitters across these membranes and to direct their further transport to specific intracellular locations. There are more than twenty types of neurotransmitter transporters.

Vesicular transporters move neurotransmitters into synaptic vesicles, regulating the concentrations of substances within them. Vesicular transporters rely on a proton gradient created by the hydrolysis of adenosine triphosphate (ATP) in order to carry out their work: v-ATPase hydrolyzes ATP, causing protons to be pumped into the synaptic vesicles and creating a proton gradient. Then the efflux of protons from the vesicle provides the energy to bring the neurotransmitter into the vesicle.

Neurotransmitter transporters frequently use electrochemical gradients that exist across cell membranes to carry out their work. For example, some transporters use energy obtained by the cotransport, or symport, of Na^{+} in order to move glutamate across membranes. Such neurotransporter cotransport systems are highly diverse, as recent development indicates that uptake systems are generally selective and associate with a specific neurotransmitter.

Normally, transporters in the synaptic membrane serve to remove neurotransmitters from the synaptic cleft and prevent their action or bring it to an end. However, on occasion transporters can work in reverse, transporting neurotransmitters into the synapse, allowing these neurotransmitters to bind to their receptors and exert their effect. This "nonvesicular release" of neurotransmitters is used by some cells, such as amacrine cells in the retina, as a normal form of neurotransmitter release.

== Types ==
Structure of a typical chemical synapse

Specific types of neurotransmitter transporters include the following:

- Glutamate/aspartate transporters, including:
  - Excitatory amino acid transporter 1 (EAAT1)
  - Excitatory amino acid transporter 2 (EAAT2)
  - Excitatory amino acid transporter 3 (EAAT3)
  - Excitatory amino acid transporter 4 (EAAT4)
  - Excitatory amino acid transporter 5 (EAAT5)
  - Vesicular glutamate transporter 1 (VGLUT1)
  - Vesicular glutamate transporter 2 (VGLUT2)
  - Vesicular glutamate transporter 3 (VGLUT3)
- GABA transporters, including:
  - GABA transporter type 1 (GAT1)
  - GABA transporter type 2 (GAT2)
  - GABA transporter type 3 (GAT3)
  - Betaine transporter (BGT1)
  - Vesicular GABA transporter (VGAT)
- Glycine transporters, including:
  - Glycine transporter type 1 (GlyT1)
  - Glycine transporter type 2 (GlyT2)
- Monoamine transporters, including:
  - Dopamine transporter (DAT)
  - Norepinephrine transporter (NET)
  - Serotonin transporter (SERT)
  - Vesicular monoamine transporter 1 (VMAT1)
  - Vesicular monoamine transporter 2 (VMAT2)
- Adenosine transporters, including:
  - Equilibrative nucleoside transporter 1 (ENT1)
  - Equilibrative nucleoside transporter 2 (ENT2)
  - Equilibrative nucleoside transporter 3 (ENT3)
  - Equilibrative nucleoside transporter 4 (ENT4)
- Vesicular acetylcholine transporter (VAChT)

Note that there is no plasmalemmal acetylcholine transporter, as acetylcholine is terminated via rapid metabolism into choline by cholinesterase enzymes, and choline is subsequently transported back into the cell and reconverted into acetylcholine.

Transporters associated with histamine and the endocannabinoids have not yet been identified.

== Clinical significance ==
A variety of neurotransmitter reuptake transporters are pharmacotherapeutic targets for modulating the synaptic neurotransmitter concentration, and therefore neurotransmission.

- Antidepressants such as SSRIs, SNRIs and TCAs suppress the activity of serotonin and/or norepinephrine transporters, preventing the reuptake of targeted neurotransmitters from the synaptic cleft.
- Psychostimulants like cocaine, amphetamines, and methylphenidate act by inhibiting and/or reversing the dopamine and/or norepinephrine transporters. Some dissociatives like phencyclidine and ketamine are also dopamine transporter inhibitors.
- Tiagabine, a drug used as an anticonvulsant, acts by inhibiting the GABA transporter 1.

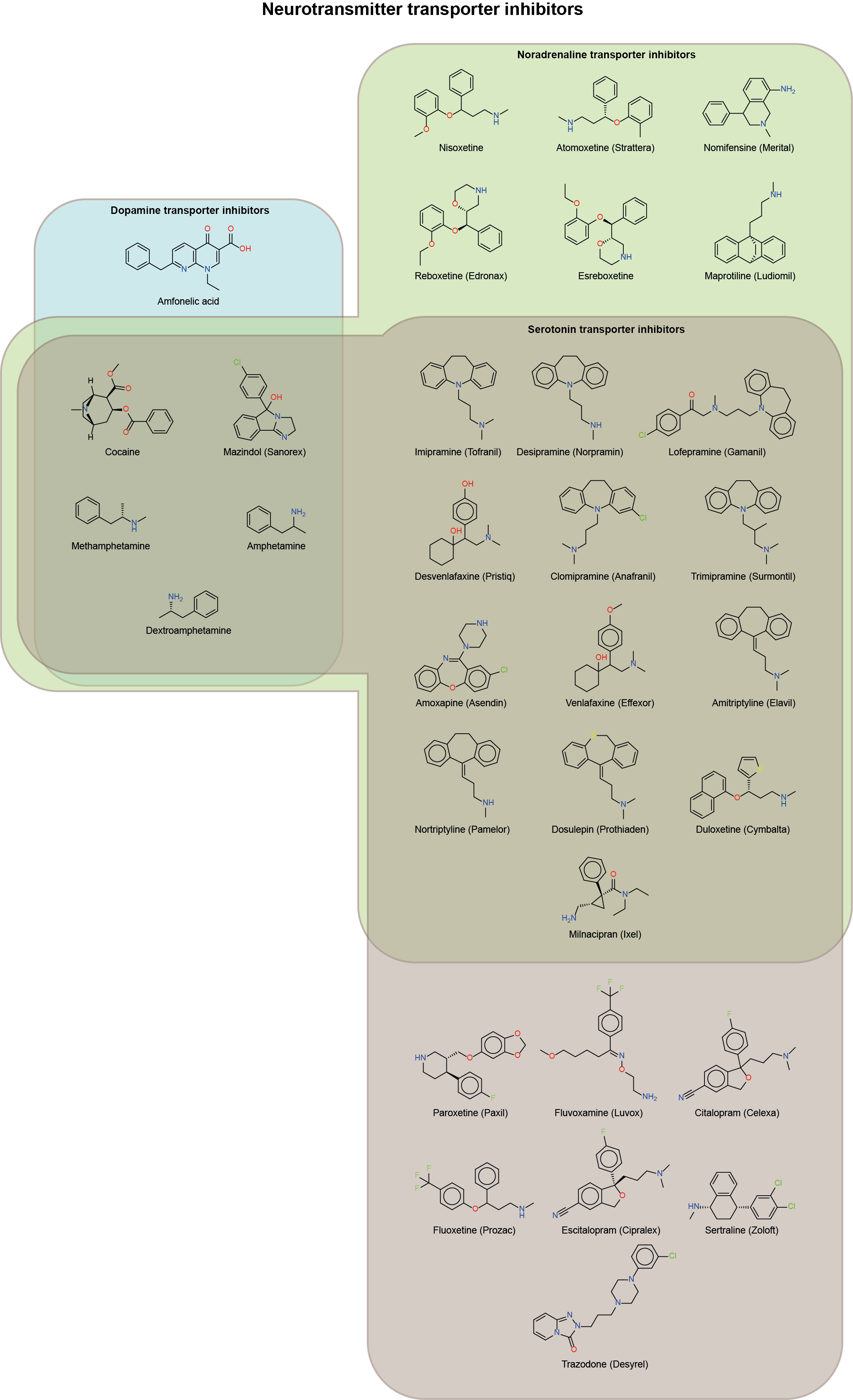
Neurotransmitter transporters inhibitors

Vesicular transporters could provide an alternative therapeutic target for the modulation of chemical neurotransmission, as the activity of these transporters could affect the quantity of neurotransmitter released.

- Vesamicol, for example, is an inhibitor of the vesicular acetylcholine transporter. It prevents the loading of ACh into the presynaptic vesicles, causing a fall in the amount that is released in response to a neuronal action potential. It is not used clinically, but provides a useful tool for research into the behaviour of neurotransmitter vesicles.
