= Excitatory amino acid receptor ligand =

Type of ligand

Excitatory amino acid receptor ligands are ligands of excitatory amino acid receptors (EAARs), also known as glutamate receptors. They include excitatory amino acid receptor agonists and excitatory amino acid receptor antagonists.
