= Solute carrier family 10 member 4 =

Protein-coding gene in the species Homo sapiens

SLC10A4

Identifiers
- Aliases: SLC10A4, P4, solute carrier family 10 member 4
- External IDs: MGI: 3606480; GeneCards: SLC10A4

Gene location (Human)
Chr.	Chromosome 4 (human)
Band	4p11	Start	48,483,343 bp
Band	4p11	End	48,489,526 bp

Gene location (Mouse)
Chr.	Chromosome 5 (mouse)
Band	5|5 C3.2	Start	73,164,226 bp
Band	5|5 C3.2	End	73,170,298 bp
RNA expression pattern
Bgee	Human / Mouse (ortholog); Top expressed in: pars reticulata; pars compacta; testicle; pituitary gland; superior vestibular nucleus; anterior pituitary; endothelial cell; prefrontal cortex; hypothalamus; putamen / Top expressed in: neural tube; striatum of neuraxis; morula; anterior horn of spinal cord; mesencephalon; adrenal gland; superior frontal gyrus; embryo; rhombencephalon; autonomic nervous system; More reference expression data
BioGPS	n/a
Gene ontology
Molecular function	symporter activity; bile acid:sodium symporter activity
Cellular component	integral component of membrane; plasma membrane; membrane; integral component of synaptic vesicle membrane; dopaminergic synapse; cholinergic synapse; serotonergic synapse
Biological process	ion transport; transmembrane transport; sodium ion transport; bile acid and bile salt transport; adult behavior; regulation of neurotransmitter loading into synaptic vesicle
Sources:Amigo / QuickGO
Orthologs
Databases	NCBI: entry; OMA: entry
Species	Human	Mouse
Entrez	201780	231290
Ensembl	ENSG00000145248	ENSMUSG00000029219
UniProt	Q96EP9	Q3UEZ8
RefSeq (mRNA)	NM_152679	NM_173403
RefSeq (protein)	NP_689892	NP_775579
Location (UCSC)	Chr 4: 48.48 – 48.49 Mb	Chr 5: 73.16 – 73.17 Mb
PubMed search
- Wikidata
View/Edit Human	View/Edit Mouse

Solute carrier family 10 member 4 is a protein that in humans is encoded by the SLC10A4 gene. In mice, it appears to promote acidification of synaptic vesicles containing monoamines, enhancing their uptake, and is co-expressed with VMAT2 and VAChT.
