= ARL6IP5 =

Protein-coding gene in humans

Identifiers
- Aliases: ARL6IP5, DERP11, GTRAP3-18, JWA, PRAF3, addicsin, hp22, jmx, HSPC127, Yip6b, ADP ribosylation factor like GTPase 6 interacting protein 5
- External IDs: OMIM: 605709; MGI: 1929501; HomoloGene: 4673; GeneCards: ARL6IP5; OMA:ARL6IP5 - orthologs

Gene location (Human)
Chr.	Chromosome 3 (human)
Band	3p14.1	Start	69,084,937 bp
Band	3p14.1	End	69,106,092 bp

Gene location (Mouse)
Chr.	Chromosome 6 (mouse)
Band	6|6 D3	Start	97,187,650 bp
Band	6|6 D3	End	97,210,276 bp
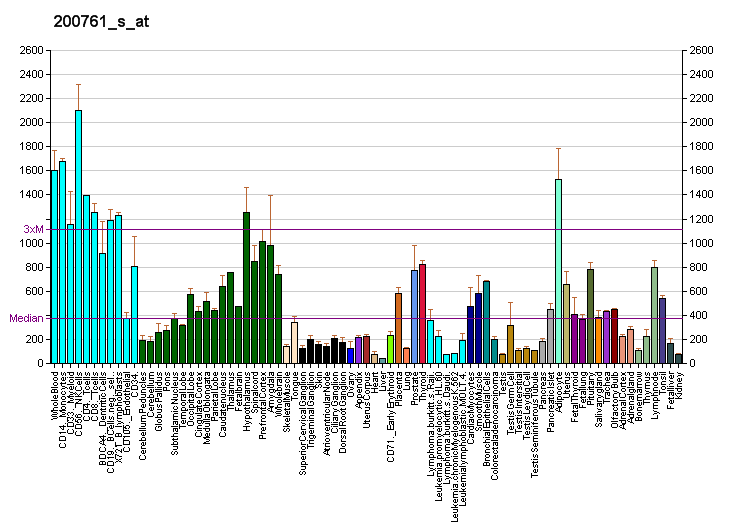

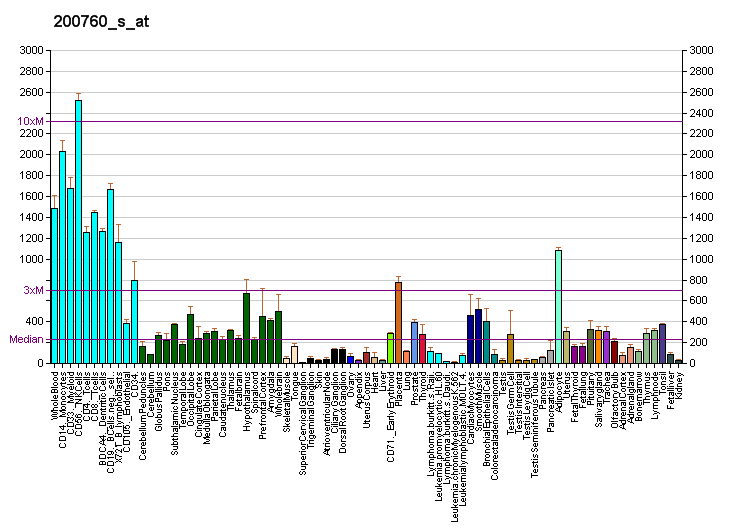
RNA expression pattern
Bgee	Human / Mouse (ortholog); Top expressed in: endothelial cell; lateral nuclear group of thalamus; visceral pleura; parietal pleura; right ventricle; superficial temporal artery; Skeletal muscle tissue of biceps brachii; hair follicle; pars compacta; synovial joint / Top expressed in: ankle; digastric muscle; temporal muscle; muscle of thigh; superior frontal gyrus; primary visual cortex; triceps brachii muscle; sternocleidomastoid muscle; decidua; cerebellar cortex; More reference expression data
BioGPS	More reference expression data
Gene ontology
Molecular function	protein binding; molecular function
Cellular component	cytoplasm; integral component of membrane; plasma membrane; extracellular exosome; cytoskeleton; endoplasmic reticulum membrane; membrane; endoplasmic reticulum
Biological process	negative regulation of mitochondrial membrane potential; intrinsic apoptotic signaling pathway in response to oxidative stress; positive regulation of cysteine-type endopeptidase activity involved in apoptotic process; L-glutamate transmembrane transport; positive regulation of stress-activated MAPK cascade; positive regulation of apoptotic process; negative regulation of L-glutamate import across plasma membrane
Sources:Amigo / QuickGO
Orthologs
Species	Human	Mouse
Entrez	10550	65106
Ensembl	ENSG00000144746	ENSMUSG00000035199
UniProt	O75915	Q8R5J9
RefSeq (mRNA)	NM_006407	NM_022992
RefSeq (protein)	NP_006398	NP_075368
Location (UCSC)	Chr 3: 69.08 – 69.11 Mb	Chr 6: 97.19 – 97.21 Mb
PubMed search
- Wikidata
View/Edit Human	View/Edit Mouse

PRA1 family protein 3 is a protein that in humans is encoded by the ARL6IP5 gene.

== Function ==
Expression of this gene is affected by vitamin A. The encoded protein of this gene may be associated with the cytoskeleton. A similar protein in rats may play a role in the regulation of cell differentiation. The rat protein binds and inhibits the cell membrane glutamate transporter EAAC1. The expression of the rat gene is upregulated by retinoic acid, which results in a specific reduction in EAAC1-mediated glutamate transport. The disruption of the mouse gene results in increased neuronal glutathione content, neuroprotection against oxidative stress and a better performance in motor/spatial learning and memory tests than wild-type mice.

== Interactions ==
ARL6IP5 has been shown to interact with SLC1A1.
