= Thyroxine-binding proteins =

A thyroxine-binding protein is any of several transport proteins that bind thyroid hormone and carry it around the bloodstream. Examples include:

- Thyroxine-binding globulin
- Transthyretin
- Serum albumin
