= Calmodulin-binding proteins =

Protein family

Calmodulin-binding proteins are, as their name implies, proteins which bind calmodulin. Calmodulin can bind to a variety of proteins through a two-step binding mechanism, namely "conformational and mutually induced fit", where typically two domains of calmodulin wrap around an emerging helical calmodulin binding domain from the target protein.

Examples include:

- Gap-43 protein (presynaptic)
- Neurogranin (postsynaptic)
- Caldesmon

== Ca^{2+} Activation ==
A variety of different ions, including Calcium (Ca^{2+}), play a vital role in the regulation of cellular functions. Calmodulin, a Calcium-binding protein, that mediates Ca^{2+} signaling is involved in all types of cellular mechanisms, including metabolism, synaptic plasticity, nerve growth, smooth muscle contraction, etc. Calmodulin allows for a number of proteins to aid in the progression of these pathways using their interactions with CaM in its Ca^{2+}-free or Ca^{2+}-bound state. Proteins each have their own unique affinities for calmodulin, that can be manipulated by Ca^{2+} concentrations to allow for the desired release or binding to calmodulin that determines its ability to carry out its cellular function. Proteins that get activated upon binding to Ca^{2+}-bound state, include Myosin light-chain kinase, Phosphatase, Ca^{2+}/calmodulin-dependent protein kinase II, etc. Proteins, such as neurogranin that plays a vital role in postsynaptic function, however, can bind to calmodulin in Ca^{2+}-free or Ca^{2+}-bound state via their IQ calmodulin-binding motifs. Since these interactions are exceptionally specific, they can be regulated through post-translational modifications by enzymes like kinases and phosphatases to affect their cellular functions. In the case of neurogranin, it's the synaptic function can be inhibited by the PKC-mediated phosphorylation of its IQ calmodulin-binding motif that impedes its interaction with calmodulin.

Cellular functions can be indirectly regulated by calmodulin, as it acts as a mediator for enzymes that require Ca^{2+} stimulation for activation. Studies have proven that calmodulin's affinity for Ca^{2+} increases when it is bound to a calmodulin-binding protein, which allows for it to take on its regulatory role for Ca^{2+}-dependent reactions. Calmodulin, made up of two pairs of EF-hand motifs separated in different structural regions by an extended alpha helical region, that permits it to respond to the changes in the cytosolic concentration of the Ca^{2+} ions by taking on two distinct conformations, in the inactive Ca^{2+} unbound state and active Ca^{2+} bound state. Calmodulin binds to the targeted proteins via their short complementary peptide sequences, causing an “induced fit” conformational change that alters the calmodulin-binding proteins’ activity as desired in response to the second messenger Ca^{2+} signals that arise due to changes in the intracellular Ca^{2+} concentrations. These second messenger Ca^{2+} signals are transduced and integrated to maintain a homeostatic balance of the Ca^{2+} ions.

== GAP-43 Protein ==
Found in the nervous system, GAP-43 is a growth-associated protein (GAP) expressed in high levels during presynaptic developmental and regenerative axonal growth. As a major growth cone component, an increase in GAP-43 concentrations delays the process of axonal growth cones evolving into stable synaptic terminals. All GAP-43 proteins share a completely conserved amino acid sequence that contain a calmodulin-binding domain and a serine residue that can be used to inhibit calmodulin binding upon phosphorylation of Protein kinase C (PKC). By possessing these calmodulin-binding properties, GAP-43 is able to respond to PKC activation and release free calmodulin in desired areas. When there are low levels of Ca^{2+} concentrations, GAP-43 is able to bind and stabilize the inactive Ca^{2+}-free state of calmodulin, this allows it to absorb and reversibly inactivate the CaM in the growth cones. This binding of the calmodulin to GAP-43 is allowed by the electrostatic interaction between the negatively-charged calmodulin and the positively-charged “pocket” formed in the GAP-43 molecule.
