= WAY-213,613 =

Chemical compound

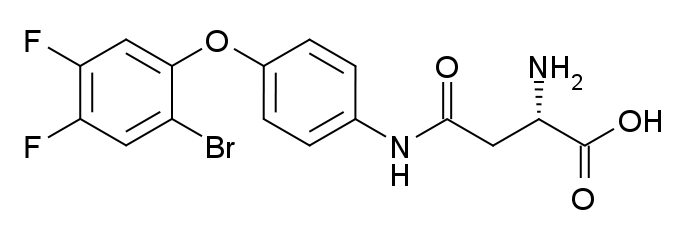

Identifiers
- IUPAC name: (2S)-2-amino-4-[4-(2-bromo-4,5-difluorophenoxy)anilino]-4-oxobutanoic acid
- CAS Number: 868359-05-1
- PubChem CID: 11531745
- IUPHAR/BPS: 4531
- ChemSpider: 9706528
- UNII: 8QTE6AZR4F
- ChEMBL: ChEMBL1628669
- CompTox Dashboard (EPA): DTXSID60468142
- ECHA InfoCard: 100.212.988

Chemical and physical data
- Formula: C_{16}H_{13}BrF_{2}N_{2}O_{4}
- Molar mass: 415.191 g·mol^{−1}
- 3D model (JSmol): Interactive image
- SMILES: C1=CC(=CC=C1NC(=O)C[C@@H](C(=O)O)N)OC2=CC(=C(C=C2Br)F)F
- InChI: InChI=1S/C16H13BrF2N2O4/c17-10-5-11(18)12(19)6-14(10)25-9-3-1-8(2-4-9)21-15(22)7-13(20)16(23)24/h1-6,13H,7,20H2,(H,21,22)(H,23,24)/t13-/m0/s1; Key:BNYDDAAZMBUFRG-ZDUSSCGKSA-N

WAY-213,613 is a drug which acts as a reuptake inhibitor for the glutamate transporter subtype EAAT_{2}, selective over other glutamate transporter subtypes and highly selective over metabotropic and ionotropic glutamate receptors. It is used in scientific research into the function of the glutamate transporters.
