= Excitatory amino acid receptor antagonist =

Class of chemical compounds

An excitatory amino acid receptor antagonist, or glutamate receptor antagonist, is a chemical substance which antagonizes one or more of the glutamate receptors.

Examples include:

- AP5
- Barbiturates
- Dextromethorphan
- Dextrorphan
- Dizocilpine
- Ethanol
- Ibogaine
- Ifenprodil
- Ketamine
- Kynurenic acid
- Memantine
- Nitrous oxide
- Perampanel
- Phencyclidine

== See also ==
- Excitatory amino acid receptor agonist
- Excitatory amino acid reuptake inhibitor
- N-methyl-D-aspartate receptor antagonist
