= Glutamate transporter =

Family of neurotransmitter transporter proteins

Glutamate transporters are a family of neurotransmitter transporter proteins that move glutamate – the principal excitatory neurotransmitter – across a membrane. The family of glutamate transporters is composed of two primary subclasses: the excitatory amino acid transporter (EAAT) family and vesicular glutamate transporter (VGLUT) family. In the brain, EAATs remove glutamate from the synaptic cleft and extrasynaptic sites via glutamate reuptake into glial cells and neurons, while VGLUTs move glutamate from the cell cytoplasm into synaptic vesicles. Glutamate transporters also transport aspartate and are present in virtually all peripheral tissues, including the heart, liver, testes, and bone. They exhibit stereoselectivity for L-glutamate but transport both L-aspartate and D-aspartate.

The EAATs are membrane-bound secondary transporters that superficially resemble ion channels. These transporters play the important role of regulating concentrations of glutamate in the extracellular space by transporting it along with other ions across cellular membranes. After glutamate is released as the result of an action potential, glutamate transporters quickly remove it from the extracellular space to keep its levels low, thereby terminating the synaptic transmission.

Without the activity of glutamate transporters, glutamate would build up and kill cells in a process called excitotoxicity, in which excessive amounts of glutamate acts as a toxin to neurons by triggering a number of biochemical cascades. The activity of glutamate transporters also allows glutamate to be recycled for repeated release.

== Classes ==
protein	gene	tissue distribution
EAAT1	SLC1A3	astroglia
EAAT2	SLC1A2	Mainly astroglia; mediates >90% of CNS glutamate reuptake
EAAT3	SLC1A1	all neurons – located on dendrites and axon terminals
EAAT4	SLC1A6	neurons
EAAT5	SLC1A7	retina
VGLUT1	SLC17A7	neurons
VGLUT2	SLC17A6	neurons
VGLUT3	SLC17A8	neurons

There are two general classes of glutamate transporters, those that are dependent on an electrochemical gradient of sodium ions (the EAATs) and those that are not (VGLUTs and xCT). The cystine-glutamate antiporter (xCT) is localised to the plasma membrane of cells whilst vesicular glutamate transporters (VGLUTs) are found in the membrane of glutamate-containing synaptic vesicles. Na^{+}-dependent EAATs are also dependent on transmembrane K^{+} and H^{+}concentration gradients, and so are also known as 'sodium and potassium coupled glutamate transporters'. Na^{+}-dependent transporters have also been called 'high-affinity glutamate transporters', though their glutamate affinity actually varies widely. EAATs are antiporters which carry one molecule of glutamate in along with three Na^{+} and one H^{+}, while export one K^{+}. EAATs are transmembrane integral proteins which traverse the plasmalemma 8 times.

Mitochondria also possess mechanisms for taking up glutamate that are quite distinct from membrane glutamate transporters.

=== EAATs ===
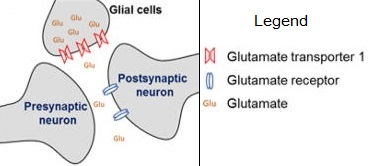
This diagram shows the tissue distribution of glutamate transporter 1 (EAAT2) in the brain. EAAT2 is responsible for over 90% of CNS glutamate reuptake.

In humans (as well as in rodents), five subtypes have been identified and named EAAT1-5 (SLC1A3, SLC1A2, SLC1A1, SLC1A6, SLC1A7). Subtypes EAAT1-2 are found in membranes of glial cells (astrocytes, microglia, and oligodendrocytes). However, low levels of EAAT2 are also found in the axon-terminals of hippocampal CA3 pyramidal cells. EAAT2 is responsible for over 90% of glutamate reuptake within the central nervous system (CNS). The EAAT3-4 subtypes are exclusively neuronal, and are expressed in axon terminals, cell bodies, and dendrites. Finally, EAAT5 is only found in the retina where it is principally localized to photoreceptors and bipolar neurons in the retina.

When glutamate is taken up into glial cells by the EAATs, it is converted to glutamine and subsequently transported back into the presynaptic neuron, converted back into glutamate, and taken up into synaptic vesicles by action of the VGLUTs. This process is named the glutamate–glutamine cycle.

=== VGLUTs ===
Three types of vesicular glutamate transporters are known, VGLUTs 1–3 (SLC17A7, SLC17A6, and SLC17A8 respectively) and the novel glutamate/aspartate transporter sialin. These transporters pack the neurotransmitter into synaptic vesicles so that they can be released into the synapse. VGLUTs are dependent on the proton gradient that exists in the secretory system (vesicles being more acidic than the cytosol). VGLUTs have only between one hundredth and one thousandth the affinity for glutamate that EAATs have. Also unlike EAATs, they do not appear to transport aspartate.

==== VGluT3 ====
VGluT3 (Vesicular Glutamate Transporter 3) that is encoded by the SLC17A8 gene is a member of the vesicular glutamate transporter family that transports glutamate into the cells. It is involved in neurological and pain diseases.

Neurons are able to express VGluT3 when they use a neurotransmitter different to Glutamate, for example in the specific case of central 5-HT neurons. The role of this unconventional transporter (VGluT3) still remains unknown but, at the moment, has been demonstrated that, in auditory system, the VGluT3 is involved in fast excitatory glutamatergic transmission very similar to the other two vesicular glutamate transporters, VGluT1 and VGluT2.

There are behavioral and physiological consequences of VGluT3 ablation because it modulates a wide range of neuronal and physiological processes like anxiety, mood regulation, impulsivity, aggressive behavior, pain perception, sleep–wake cycle, appetite, body temperature and sexual behavior. Certainly, no significant change was found in aggression and depression-like behaviors, but in contrast, the loss of VGluT3 resulted in a specific anxiety-related phenotype.

The sensory nerve fibers have different ways to detect the pain hypersensivity throughout their sensory modalities and conduction velocities, but at the moment is still unknown which types of sensory is related to the different forms of inflammatory and neuropathic pain hypersensivity. In this case, Vesicular glutamate transporter 3 (VGluT3), have been implicated in mechanical hypersensitivity after inflammation, but their role in neuropathic pain still remains under debate.

VGluT3 has extensive somatic throughout development, which could be involved in non-synaptic modulation by glutamate in developing retina, and could influence trophic and extra-synaptic neuronal signaling by glutamate in the inner retina.

== Molecular Structure of EAATs ==
Like all glutamate transporters, EAATs are trimers, with each protomer consisting of two domains : the central scaffold domain (Figure 1A, wheat) and the peripheral transport domain (Figure 1A, blue). The transport conformational path is as follows. First, the outward facing conformation occurs (OF, open) which allows the glutamate to bind. Then the HP2 region closes after uptake (OF, closed) and the elevator like movement carries the substrate to the intracellular side of the membrane. It worth nothing that this elevator motion consists of several yet to be categorized/identified conformational changes. After the elevator motion brings the substrate to the IC side of the membrane, EAAT adopts the inward facing (IF, closed) state in which the transport domain is lowered, but the HP2 gate is still closed with the glutamate still bound to the transporter. Lastly, the HP2 gate opens and the glutamate diffuses into the cytoplasm of the cell.

== Pathology ==
Overactivity of glutamate transporters may result in inadequate synaptic glutamate and may be involved in schizophrenia and other mental illnesses.

During injury processes such as ischemia and traumatic brain injury, the action of glutamate transporters may fail, leading to toxic buildup of glutamate. In fact, their activity may also actually be reversed due to inadequate amounts of adenosine triphosphate to power ATPase pumps, resulting in the loss of the electrochemical ion gradient. Since the direction of glutamate transport depends on the ion gradient, these transporters release glutamate instead of removing it, which results in neurotoxicity due to overactivation of glutamate receptors.

Loss of the Na^{+}-dependent glutamate transporter EAAT2 is suspected to be associated with neurodegenerative diseases such as Alzheimer's disease, Huntington's disease, and ALS–parkinsonism dementia complex. Also, degeneration of motor neurons in the disease amyotrophic lateral sclerosis has been linked to loss of EAAT2 from patients' brains and spinal cords.

Addiction to certain addictive drugs (e.g., cocaine, heroin, alcohol, and nicotine) is correlated with a persistent reduction in the expression of EAAT2 in the nucleus accumbens (NAcc); the reduced expression of EAAT2 in this region is implicated in addictive drug-seeking behavior. In particular, the long-term dysregulation of glutamate neurotransmission in the NAcc of addicts is associated with an increase in vulnerability to relapse after re-exposure to the addictive drug or its associated drug cues. Drugs which help to normalize the expression of EAAT2 in this region, such as N-acetylcysteine, have been proposed as an adjunct therapy for the treatment of addiction to cocaine, nicotine, alcohol, and other drugs.

== See also ==
- Dopamine transporters
- Norepinephrine transporters
- Serotonin transporters
- NMDA receptors
- AMPA receptors
- Kainate receptors
- Metabotropic glutamate receptors
