= Vesicular acetylcholine transporter =

Protein-coding gene in the species Homo sapiens

SLC18A3

Identifiers
- Aliases: SLC18A3, VACHT, solute carrier family 18 member A3, CMS21
- External IDs: OMIM: 600336; MGI: 1101061; GeneCards: SLC18A3

Gene location (Human)
| Chr. | Chromosome 10 (human) |
| Band | 10q11.23 | Start | 49,610,310 bp |
| Band | 10q11.23 | End | 49,612,720 bp |

Gene location (Mouse)
| Chr. | Chromosome 14 (mouse) |
| Band | 14 B|14 19.4 cM | Start | 32,184,395 bp |
| Band | 14 B|14 19.4 cM | End | 32,186,807 bp |
RNA expression pattern
| Bgee | Human / Mouse (ortholog); Top expressed in: gonad; putamen; caudate nucleus; placenta; muscle layer of sigmoid colon; nucleus accumbens; hypothalamus; C1 segment; muscle tissue; pituitary gland / Top expressed in: lumbar subsegment of spinal cord; facial motor nucleus; anterior horn of spinal cord; habenula; neural tube; embryo; superior frontal gyrus; basal plate; embryo; neural layer of retina; More reference expression data |
| BioGPS | n/a |
Gene ontology
| Molecular function | acetylcholine binding; acetylcholine transmembrane transporter activity |
| Cellular component | integral component of membrane; plasma membrane; clathrin-sculpted acetylcholine transport vesicle membrane; AP-2 adaptor complex; AP-1 adaptor complex; clathrin-coated vesicle membrane; presynapse; membrane; terminal bouton |
| Biological process | neurotransmitter transport; neurotransmitter secretion; transmembrane transport; ammonium transmembrane transport; membrane organization; xenobiotic transmembrane transport; organic cation transport; acetate ester transport |
Sources:Amigo / QuickGO
Orthologs
| Databases | NCBI: entry; OMA: entry |
| Species | Human | Mouse |
| Entrez | 6572 | 20508 |
| Ensembl | ENSG00000187714 | ENSMUSG00000100241 |
| UniProt | Q16572 | O35304; Q3TYJ1 |
| RefSeq (mRNA) | NM_003055 | NM_021712 |
| RefSeq (protein) | NP_003046 | NP_068358 |
| Location (UCSC) | Chr 10: 49.61 – 49.61 Mb | Chr 14: 32.18 – 32.19 Mb |
| PubMed search |
- Wikidata
| View/Edit Human | View/Edit Mouse |

The Vesicular acetylcholine transporter (VAChT) is a neurotransmitter transporter which is responsible for loading acetylcholine (ACh) into secretory organelles in neurons making acetylcholine available for secretion. It is encoded by Solute carrier family 18, member 3 (SLC18A3) gene, located within the first intron of the choline acetyltransferase gene. VAChT is able to transport ACh into vesicles by relying on an exchange between protons (H^{+}) that were previously pumped into the vesicle diffusing out, thus acting as an antiporter. ACh molecules are then carried into the vesicle by the action of exiting protons. Acetylcholine transport utilizes a proton gradient established by a vacuolar ATPase.

== VAChT uptake inhibitors ==
=== Radiolabeled compounds ===
PET imaging of the VAChT may provide insights into early diagnosis of Alzheimer's disease.

- (−)-trans-2-Hydroxy-3-(4-(4-[^{18}F]fluorobenzoyl)piperidino)tetralin; racemate: Ki = 2.70 nM for VAChT, 191 nM for σ1, and 251 nM for σ2
