= Dynein regulatory complex protein 8 =

Protein found in humans

DRC8

Identifiers
- Aliases: DRC8, CFAP200, EF-hand calcium binding domain 2, EFCAB2, Dynein Regulatory Complex Subunit 8
- External IDs: MGI: 1915476; GeneCards: DRC8

Gene location (Human)
Chr.	Chromosome 1 (human)
Band	1q44	Start	244,969,682 bp
Band	1q44	End	245,127,164 bp

Gene location (Mouse)
Chr.	Chromosome 1 (mouse)
Band	1|1 H4	Start	178,233,650 bp
Band	1|1 H4	End	178,312,078 bp
RNA expression pattern
Bgee	Human / Mouse (ortholog); Top expressed in: right uterine tube; Achilles tendon; sural nerve; C1 segment; bronchial epithelial cell; left lobe of thyroid gland; right testis; right lobe of thyroid gland; left testis; olfactory zone of nasal mucosa / Top expressed in: seminiferous tubule; right ventricle; spermatid; myocardium of ventricle; lumbar subsegment of spinal cord; spermatocyte; choroidal fissure; interventricular septum; cardiac muscles; temporal muscle; More reference expression data
BioGPS	n/a
Orthologs
Databases	NCBI: entry; OMA: entry
Species	Human	Mouse
Entrez	84288	68226
Ensembl	ENSG00000203666	ENSMUSG00000026495
UniProt	Q5VUJ9	Q9CQ46
RefSeq (mRNA)	NM_001143943; NM_001290327; NM_032328	NM_026626
RefSeq (protein)	NP_001137415; NP_001277256; NP_115704	NP_080902
Location (UCSC)	Chr 1: 244.97 – 245.13 Mb	Chr 1: 178.23 – 178.31 Mb
PubMed search
- Wikidata
View/Edit Human	View/Edit Mouse

Dynein regulatory complex protein 8 is a protein that in humans is encoded by the gene DRC8 (previously EFCAB2). This protein is predicted to be a component of the nexin-dynein regulatory complex (N-DRC) which regulates the movement of the cilium/flagellum.

== Function ==
The gene encodes a protein that contains two EF-hand calcium-binding domains although its function has yet to be determined. Alternatively spliced transcripts have been observed.
