= Riboflavin carrier protein =

Riboflavin carrier proteins (RFCPs) together with human serum albumin transport flavin mononucleotide (FMN) in the blood circuit. RFCPs are important in pregnancy.

Studies from India have identified a riboflavin carrier protein (RCP) present in bird (e.g., chicken) eggs, which is considered to be specific for riboflavin, and is essential for normal embryological development. If this protein is rendered ineffective (e.g., by immuno-neutralization) by treatment of the bird with a specific antibody, then embryonic development ceases and the embryo dies. A genetic mutant lacking RCP is likewise infertile. A homologous protein, which can be rendered ineffective by the antibody to pure chicken riboflavin carrier protein, has been shown to occur in several mammalian species, including two species of monkeys, and also in humans. Very recent studies have suggested that circulating RCP levels and the immunohistochemical staining of RCP in biopsy specimens may provide new markers for breast cancer diagnosis and prognosis. Termination of pregnancy has been demonstrated by immuno-neutralization of RCP in monkeys. There remains some controversy over the roles of RCP, however, the other, less specific riboflavin binders in blood, including gamma-gobulins, also seem to play an important role. These studies have provided an intriguing example of the role of specific vitamin-transporting mechanisms, designed to ensure that the vitamin needs of the developing embryo will be efficiency met. Further evidence of the special needs of developing embryos has been provided by the demonstration that riboflavin analogs can cause teratogenic changes, even in the absence of any detectable damage to maternal tissues.

== Chicken Riboflavin carrier protein ==
RCP in chicken eggs is in both the yolk and whites. The RCP found in the yolk differs from that of the egg white. The difference in amino acid structure of RCP attributes to the cite of production and the destination of the RCP—the yolk-RCP (made in the liver) had 11-13 less amino acid compared to the whites-RCP (made in the oviducts).

The concentration of RCP in chickens depends on the concentration of estradiol injected and an increased production of RCP can be induced.

The dependence of RCP production on estrogen enables a potential role in the detection of breast cancer.
