= Transport protein =

Protein that moves other materials within an organism

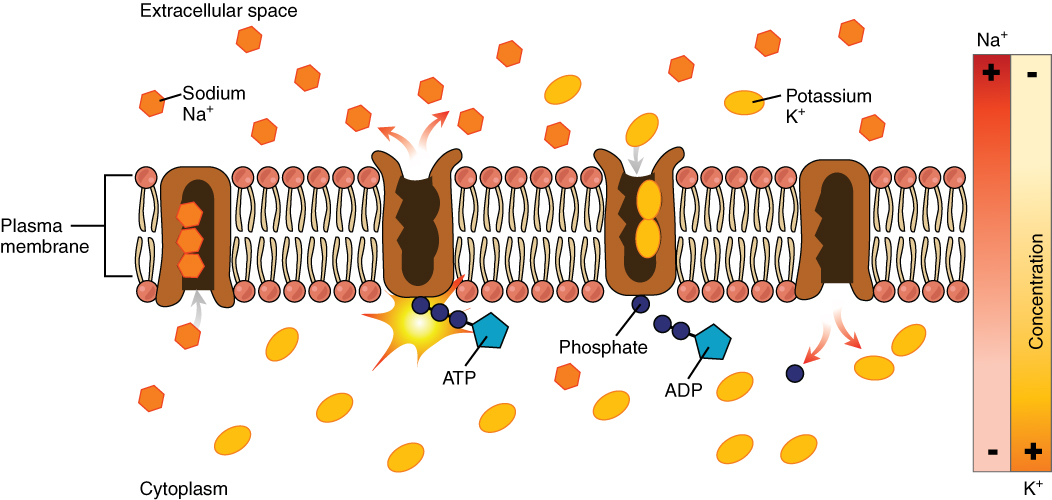
Schematic description of the mechanism of the sodium-potassium pump. Four consecutive steps are shown, from left to right. (1) Three sodium ions enter the transporter on the cell internal side. (2) A phosphorylated group is added to the transporter from ATP. This causes the transporter to close on the inside and open on the outside. The sodium ions then leave to the outside. (3) Two potassium ions enter the transporter from the outside. (4) The transporter opens to the inside while both the potassium ions and the phosphorylated group leaves it.

A transport protein (variously referred to as a transmembrane pump, transporter, escort protein, acid transport protein, cation transport protein, or anion transport protein) is a protein that serves the function of moving other materials within an organism. Transport proteins are vital to the growth and life of all living things. There are several different kinds of transport proteins.

Carrier proteins are proteins involved in the movement of ions, small molecules, or macromolecules, such as another protein, across a biological membrane. Carrier proteins are integral membrane proteins; that is, they exist within and span the membrane across which they transport substances.

The proteins may assist in the movement of substances by facilitated diffusion (i.e., passive transport) or active transport. These mechanisms of movement are known as carrier-mediated transport. Each carrier protein is designed to recognize only one substance or one group of very similar substances. Research suggests that potassium, calcium and sodium channels can function as oxygen sensors in mammals and plants, and has correlated defects in specific carrier proteins with specific diseases.

A membrane transport protein (or simply transporter) is a membrane protein that acts as such a carrier.

A vesicular transport protein is a transmembrane or membrane associated protein. It regulates or facilitates the movement by vesicles of the contents of the cell.

== See also ==
- Solute carrier family
- Neurotransmitter transporter
