= Neurogranin =

NRGN

Identifiers
- Aliases: NRGN, RC3, hng, neurogranin
- External IDs: OMIM: 602350; MGI: 1927184; GeneCards: NRGN

Gene location (Human)
Chr.	Chromosome 11 (human)
Band	11q24.2	Start	124,739,942 bp
Band	11q24.2	End	124,747,210 bp

Gene location (Mouse)
Chr.	Chromosome 9 (mouse)
Band	9 A4|9 20.78 cM	Start	37,455,788 bp
Band	9 A4|9 20.78 cM	End	37,464,200 bp
RNA expression pattern
Bgee	Human / Mouse (ortholog); Top expressed in: Brodmann area 10; frontal pole; Brodmann area 46; cingulate gyrus; anterior cingulate cortex; caudate nucleus; putamen; dorsolateral prefrontal cortex; parietal lobe; orbitofrontal cortex / Top expressed in: superior frontal gyrus; primary visual cortex; dentate gyrus of hippocampal formation granule cell; primary motor cortex; piriform cortex; prefrontal cortex; CA3 field; entorhinal cortex; inferior colliculi; subiculum; More reference expression data
BioGPS	n/a
Gene ontology
Molecular function	phosphatidic acid binding; phosphatidylinositol-3,4,5-trisphosphate binding; calmodulin binding
Cellular component	cytoplasm; axon; trans-Golgi network transport vesicle membrane; soma; dendrite; synapse; dendritic spine head; mitochondrial membranes; nucleus; postsynaptic density; postsynaptic membrane; postsynapse; glutamatergic synapse; cytosol
Biological process	telencephalon development; associative learning; positive regulation of long-term synaptic potentiation; signal transduction; nervous system development; postsynaptic modulation of chemical synaptic transmission
Sources:Amigo / QuickGO
Orthologs
Databases	NCBI: entry; OMA: entry
Species	Human	Mouse
Entrez	4900	64011
Ensembl	ENSG00000154146	ENSMUSG00000053310
UniProt	Q92686	P60761
RefSeq (mRNA)	NM_006176; NM_001126181	NM_022029
RefSeq (protein)	NP_001119653; NP_006167	NP_071312
Location (UCSC)	Chr 11: 124.74 – 124.75 Mb	Chr 9: 37.46 – 37.46 Mb
PubMed search
- Wikidata
View/Edit Human	View/Edit Mouse

Neurogranin is a calmodulin-binding protein expressed primarily in the brain, particularly in dendritic spines, and participating in the protein kinase C signaling pathway. Neurogranin has also been identified in aortic endothelial cells and cardiomyocytes. It is the main postsynaptic protein regulating the availability of calmodulin by binding to it in the absence of calcium.

== History ==
Prior to its identification in bovine and rat brain in 1991, neurogranin was known as a putative protein kinase C-phosphorylated protein named p17. Human neurogranin was cloned in 1997 and was found to be 96% identical to the rat protein.

== Structure ==
Human neurogranin is a small protein consisting of 78 amino acids. Neurogranin belongs to a family of neuron-enriched calmodulin-binding proteins, together with neuromodulin (GAP-43), sharing a conserved central motif that functions both as the protein kinase C phosphorylation site and the calmodulin-binding domain.

The protein contains an IQ motif (consensus sequence IQXXXRGXXXR), a characteristic sequence found in several calmodulin-binding proteins that mediates preferential binding to apo-calmodulin (calcium-free calmodulin). Phosphorylation of this region by protein kinase C reduces the affinity of neurogranin for calmodulin and modulates its signaling properties.

== Function ==
Neurogranin regulates intracellular calmodulin availability and functions as a key component of protein kinase C signaling. It preferentially binds calmodulin in the absence of calcium, whereas phosphorylation by protein kinase C reduces its calmodulin-binding capacity.

Expression of the NRGN gene is regulated by thyroid hormones through a thyroid hormone-responsive element located in the first intron.

Recent studies suggest that neurogranin also contributes to cardiovascular physiology. In cardiomyocytes it regulates calcium-dependent cardiac hypertrophy, and in endothelial cells it influences mitochondrial function and redox balance.

== Clinical significance ==
Genetic and neuropathological evidence has implicated neurogranin in schizophrenia. One study reported an association between variation in the NRGN gene and increased risk of schizophrenia in males, while another demonstrated reduced neurogranin immunoreactivity in the prefrontal cortex of affected individuals.

Neurogranin concentration in cerebrospinal fluid (CSF) has been investigated as a marker of synaptic dysfunction in age-related neurodegeneration. CSF neurogranin has been shown to be increased in patients with Alzheimer's disease. In particular, the ratio of CSF neurogranin truncated at P75 to the beta-secretase BACE1 has been proposed as a potential marker of cognitive deterioration during progression of Alzheimer's disease.
