= Excitatory amino acid receptor agonist =

Class of pharmaceutical compounds

An excitatory amino acid receptor agonist, or glutamate receptor agonist, is a chemical substance which agonizes one or more of the glutamate receptors.

Examples include:

- AMPA
- Glutamic acid
- Ibotenic acid
- Kainic acid
- N-Methyl-D-aspartic acid
- Quisqualic acid

== See also ==
- Excitatory amino acid receptor antagonist
- Excitatory amino acid reuptake inhibitor
