= Vesicular glutamate transporter 3 =

Protein-coding gene in the species Homo sapiens

SLC17A8

Identifiers
- Aliases: SLC17A8, DFNA25, VGLUT3, solute carrier family 17 member 8
- External IDs: OMIM: 607557; MGI: 3039629; GeneCards: SLC17A8

Gene location (Human)
Chr.	Chromosome 12 (human)
Band	12q23.1	Start	100,357,074 bp
Band	12q23.1	End	100,422,055 bp

Gene location (Mouse)
Chr.	Chromosome 10 (mouse)
Band	10|10 C2	Start	89,409,882 bp
Band	10|10 C2	End	89,457,115 bp
RNA expression pattern
Bgee	Human / Mouse (ortholog); Top expressed in: testicle; gonad; oocyte; secondary oocyte; prefrontal cortex; mucosa of transverse colon; rectum; hypothalamus; amygdala; caudate nucleus / Top expressed in: organ of Corti; vestibular labyrinth; pons; liver; utricle; basal forebrain; striatum of neuraxis; neural layer of retina; ileum; ampullary crest; More reference expression data
BioGPS	n/a
Gene ontology
Molecular function	symporter activity; L-glutamate transmembrane transporter activity; neurotransmitter transmembrane transporter activity
Cellular component	cytoplasm; axon terminus; integral component of membrane; multivesicular body; perikaryon; membrane; synapse; excitatory synapse; basal dendrite; pericellular basket; synaptic vesicle membrane; cell junction; soma; dendrite; glial limiting end-foot; neuron projection; cytoplasmic vesicle; apical dendrite; integral component of synaptic vesicle membrane
Biological process	cochlea development; sodium ion transport; ion transport; hearing; brain development; neurotransmitter transport; neural retina development; L-glutamate transmembrane transport; transmembrane transport; synaptic transmission, glutamatergic; regulation of synapse structure or activity; neurotransmitter loading into synaptic vesicle
Sources:Amigo / QuickGO
Orthologs
Databases	NCBI: entry; OMA: entry
Species	Human	Mouse
Entrez	246213	216227
Ensembl	ENSG00000179520	ENSMUSG00000019935
UniProt	Q8NDX2	Q8BFU8
RefSeq (mRNA)	NM_139319; NM_001145288	NM_182959; NM_001310710
RefSeq (protein)	NP_001138760; NP_647480	NP_001297639; NP_892004
Location (UCSC)	Chr 12: 100.36 – 100.42 Mb	Chr 10: 89.41 – 89.46 Mb
PubMed search
- Wikidata
View/Edit Human	View/Edit Mouse

Vesicular glutamate transporter 3 (VGLUT3) is a protein that in humans is encoded by the SLC17A8 gene.

== Function ==
This gene encodes a vesicular glutamate transporter. The encoded protein transports the neurotransmitter glutamate into synaptic vesicles before it is released into the synaptic cleft.

== Clinical significance ==
Mutations in this gene are the cause of autosomal-dominant nonsyndromic deafness type 25 (DFNA25).
