= Amino acid neurotransmitter =

Amino acid able to transmit nerve message across a synapse

Activity at an axon terminal: Neuron A is transmitting a signal at the axon terminal to neuron B (receiving). Features: 1. Mitochondrion. 2. synaptic vesicle with neurotransmitters. 3. Autoreceptor. 4. Synapse with neurotransmitter released (serotonin). 5. Postsynaptic receptors activated by neurotransmitter (induction of a postsynaptic potential). 6. Calcium channel. 7. Exocytosis of a vesicle. 8. Recaptured neurotransmitter.

An amino acid neurotransmitter is an amino acid which is able to transmit a nerve message across a synapse. Neurotransmitters (chemicals) are packaged into vesicles that cluster beneath the axon terminal membrane on the presynaptic side of a synapse in a process called endocytosis.

Amino acid neurotransmitter release (exocytosis) is dependent upon calcium Ca^{2+} and is a presynaptic response.

== Types ==
Excitatory amino acids (EAA) will activate post-synaptic cells. inhibitory amino acids (IAA) depress the activity of post-synaptic cells.

Amino acid	Excitatory or inhibitory
Aspartic acid	Excitatory
β-alanine	Inhibitory
Cysteine	Excitatory
GABA (adult human brain)	Inhibitory (adult); excitatory (developing)
Glycine	Inhibitory
Glutamic acid	Excitatory
Homocysteine	Excitatory
Taurine	Inhibitory

== See also ==
- Amino acid non-protein functions
- Monoamine neurotransmitter
