= Vesicular glutamate transporter 1 =

Protein-coding gene in the species Homo sapiens

SLC17A7

Identifiers
- Aliases: SLC17A7, BNPI, VGLUT1, solute carrier family 17 member 7
- External IDs: OMIM: 605208; MGI: 1920211; GeneCards: SLC17A7

Gene location (Human)
Chr.	Chromosome 19 (human)
Band	19q13.33	Start	49,429,401 bp
Band	19q13.33	End	49,442,360 bp

Gene location (Mouse)
Chr.	Chromosome 7 (mouse)
Band	7|7 B3	Start	44,813,373 bp
Band	7|7 B3	End	44,825,566 bp
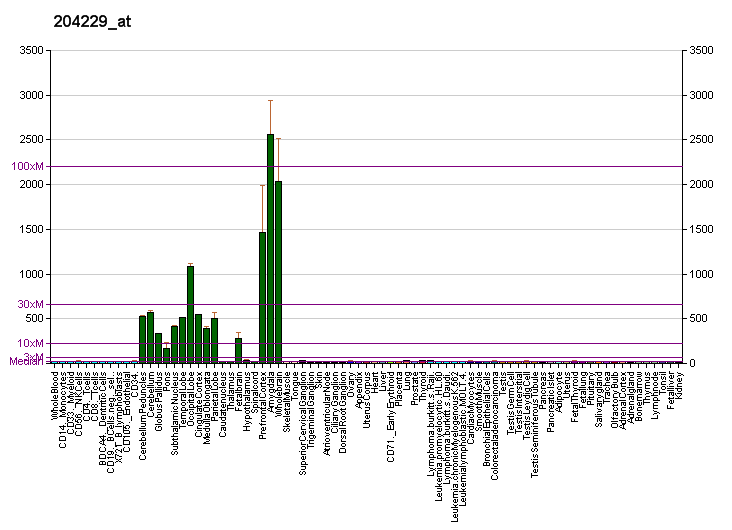

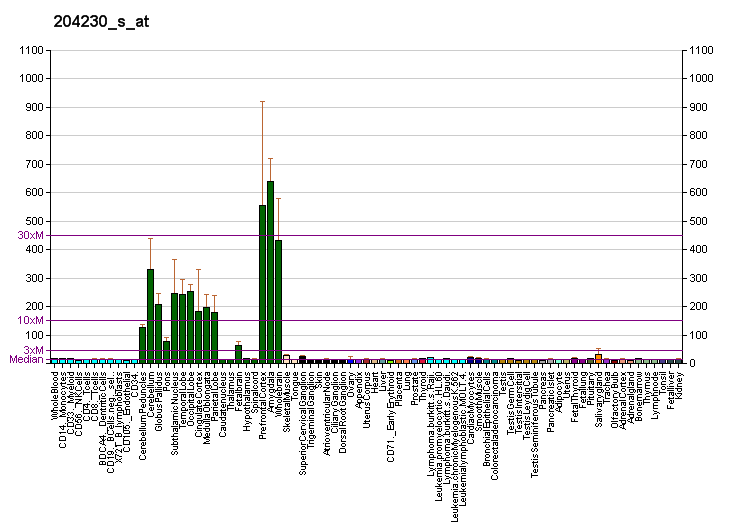
RNA expression pattern
Bgee	Human / Mouse (ortholog); Top expressed in: right hemisphere of cerebellum; right frontal lobe; superior frontal gyrus; Brodmann area 10; frontal pole; Region I of hippocampus proper; middle temporal gyrus; Brodmann area 46; dorsolateral prefrontal cortex; orbitofrontal cortex / Top expressed in: neural layer of retina; dentate gyrus of hippocampal formation granule cell; primary visual cortex; superior frontal gyrus; prefrontal cortex; piriform cortex; cerebellar cortex; hippocampus proper; primary motor cortex; subiculum; More reference expression data
BioGPS	More reference expression data
Gene ontology
Molecular function	inorganic phosphate transmembrane transporter activity; sodium:inorganic phosphate symporter activity; extracellularly glutamate-gated chloride channel activity; symporter activity; L-glutamate transmembrane transporter activity; neurotransmitter transmembrane transporter activity
Cellular component	postsynapse; integral component of membrane; membrane; synaptic vesicle; plasma membrane; synapse; excitatory synapse; synaptic vesicle membrane; cerebellar mossy fiber; presynaptic active zone; cell junction; intracellular organelle; neuron projection; clathrin-sculpted glutamate transport vesicle membrane; cytoplasmic vesicle; integral component of synaptic vesicle membrane
Biological process	phosphate ion transport; synaptic transmission, glutamatergic; sodium-dependent phosphate transport; sodium ion transport; chloride transmembrane transport; ion transport; glutamate secretion; synaptic vesicle lumen acidification; brain development; long-term memory; excitatory postsynaptic potential; neurotransmitter transport; neural retina development; L-glutamate import; sequestering of neurotransmitter; sodium ion transmembrane transport; transmembrane transport; chemical synaptic transmission; neurotransmitter loading into synaptic vesicle; L-glutamate transmembrane transport; regulation of synaptic vesicle endocytosis; regulation of synapse structure or activity
Sources:Amigo / QuickGO
Orthologs
Databases	NCBI: entry; OMA: entry
Species	Human	Mouse
Entrez	57030	72961
Ensembl	ENSG00000104888	ENSMUSG00000070570
UniProt	Q9P2U7	Q3TXX4
RefSeq (mRNA)	NM_020309	NM_182993
RefSeq (protein)	NP_064705	NP_892038
Location (UCSC)	Chr 19: 49.43 – 49.44 Mb	Chr 7: 44.81 – 44.83 Mb
PubMed search
- Wikidata
View/Edit Human	View/Edit Mouse

Vesicular glutamate transporter 1 (VGLUT1) is a protein that in humans is encoded by the SLC17A7 gene.

Loss of function by 50% of this enzyme causes anxiety and depression including suicide attempts, also, it causes a decrease in Prepulse Inhibition and centrally mediated sensory deprivation similar to schizophrenia.

The protein encoded by this gene is a vesicle-bound, sodium-dependent phosphate transporter that is specifically expressed in the neuron-rich regions of the brain. It is preferentially associated with the membranes of synaptic vesicles and functions in glutamate transport. The protein shares 82% identity with the differentiation-associated Na-dependent inorganic phosphate cotransporter and they appear to form a distinct class within the Na+/Pi cotransporter family.

== See also ==
- Solute carrier family
