= Excitatory amino acid transporter 4 =

Protein found in humans

SLC1A6

Identifiers
- Aliases: SLC1A6, EAAT4, solute carrier family 1 member 6
- External IDs: OMIM: 600637; MGI: 1096331; GeneCards: SLC1A6

Gene location (Human)
Chr.	Chromosome 19 (human)
Band	19p13.12	Start	14,950,033 bp
Band	19p13.12	End	15,022,990 bp

Gene location (Mouse)
Chr.	Chromosome 10 (mouse)
Band	10 C1|10 39.72 cM	Start	78,616,330 bp
Band	10 C1|10 39.72 cM	End	78,650,599 bp
RNA expression pattern
Bgee	Human / Mouse (ortholog); Top expressed in: right hemisphere of cerebellum; endothelial cell; left testis; right testis; paraflocculus of cerebellum; skin of thigh; cerebellar vermis; nucleus accumbens; oocyte; caudate nucleus / Top expressed in: cerebellar vermis; lobe of cerebellum; dorsomedial hypothalamic nucleus; lumbar subsegment of spinal cord; ventromedial nucleus; inferior colliculi; superior colliculus; dentate gyrus of hippocampal formation granule cell; lateral hypothalamus; ventral tegmental area; More reference expression data
BioGPS	n/a
Gene ontology
Molecular function	L-aspartate transmembrane transporter activity; symporter activity; L-glutamate transmembrane transporter activity; amino acid transmembrane transporter activity; high-affinity glutamate transmembrane transporter activity; metal ion binding
Cellular component	integral component of membrane; Golgi apparatus; membrane; intermediate filament cytoskeleton; integral component of plasma membrane; plasma membrane; glutamatergic synapse; integral component of presynaptic membrane
Biological process	chemical synaptic transmission; regulation of membrane potential; ion transport; glutamate secretion; aspartate transmembrane transport; L-glutamate transmembrane transport; L-glutamate import across plasma membrane; amino acid transport; L-aspartate transmembrane transport; neurotransmitter uptake; transmembrane transport
Sources:Amigo / QuickGO
Orthologs
Databases	NCBI: entry; OMA: entry
Species	Human	Mouse
Entrez	6511	20513
Ensembl	ENSG00000105143	ENSMUSG00000005357
UniProt	P48664	O35544
RefSeq (mRNA)	NM_001272087; NM_001272088; NM_005071; NM_001384669; NM_001384670 NM_001384671	NM_009200
RefSeq (protein)	NP_001259016; NP_001259017; NP_005062	NP_033226
Location (UCSC)	Chr 19: 14.95 – 15.02 Mb	Chr 10: 78.62 – 78.65 Mb
PubMed search
- Wikidata
View/Edit Human	View/Edit Mouse

Excitatory amino-acid transporter 4 (EAAT4) is a protein that in humans is encoded by the SLC1A6 gene.

EAAT4 is expressed predominantly in the cerebellum, has high affinity for the excitatory amino acids L-aspartate and L-glutamate. When stimulated by these amino acids, EAAT4 conducts chloride ions.
