= Excitatory amino acid transporter 5 =

Protein found in humans

SLC1A7

Identifiers
- Aliases: SLC1A7, AAAT, EAAT5, solute carrier family 1 member 7
- External IDs: OMIM: 604471; MGI: 2444087; GeneCards: SLC1A7

Gene location (Human)
Chr.	Chromosome 1 (human)
Band	1p32.3	Start	53,087,179 bp
Band	1p32.3	End	53,142,638 bp

Gene location (Mouse)
Chr.	Chromosome 4 (mouse)
Band	4|4 C7	Start	107,825,529 bp
Band	4|4 C7	End	107,870,729 bp
RNA expression pattern
Bgee	Human / Mouse (ortholog); Top expressed in: gastric mucosa; granulocyte; jejunal mucosa; right ovary; gallbladder; tibial nerve; left ovary; testicle; right coronary artery; left uterine tube / Top expressed in: neural layer of retina; epithelium of lens; outer nuclear layer; retinal pigment epithelium; inner nuclear layer; left lobe of liver; spermatid; skin of abdomen; pituitary gland; testicle; More reference expression data
BioGPS	n/a
Gene ontology
Molecular function	symporter activity; L-glutamate transmembrane transporter activity; amino acid transmembrane transporter activity; high-affinity glutamate transmembrane transporter activity
Cellular component	integral component of membrane; plasma membrane; membrane; presynapse
Biological process	glutamate secretion; ion transport; dicarboxylic acid transport; transmembrane transport; amino acid transmembrane transport; L-glutamate transmembrane transport; neurotransmitter uptake; neurotransmitter reuptake
Sources:Amigo / QuickGO
Orthologs
Databases	NCBI: entry; OMA: entry
Species	Human	Mouse
Entrez	6512	242607
Ensembl	ENSG00000162383	ENSMUSG00000008932
UniProt	O00341	Q8JZR4
RefSeq (mRNA)	NM_001287595; NM_001287596; NM_001287597; NM_006671	NM_146255
RefSeq (protein)	NP_001274524; NP_001274525; NP_001274526; NP_006662	NP_666367
Location (UCSC)	Chr 1: 53.09 – 53.14 Mb	Chr 4: 107.83 – 107.87 Mb
PubMed search
- Wikidata
View/Edit Human	View/Edit Mouse

Excitatory amino-acid transporter 5 (EAAT5) is a protein that in humans is encoded by the SLC1A7 gene.

EAAT5 is expressed predominantly in the retina, has high affinity for the excitatory amino acid L-glutamate. When stimulated by this amino acid, EAAT5 conducts chloride ions.
