= Excitatory amino acid transporter 3 =

Protein found in humans

SLC1A1

Identifiers
- Aliases: SLC1A1, EAAC1, EAAT3, SCZD18, DCBXA, solute carrier family 1 member 1
- External IDs: OMIM: 133550; MGI: 105083; GeneCards: SLC1A1

Gene location (Human)
Chr.	Chromosome 9 (human)
Band	9p24.2	Start	4,490,468 bp
Band	9p24.2	End	4,587,469 bp

Gene location (Mouse)
Chr.	Chromosome 19 (mouse)
Band	19|19 C1	Start	28,812,449 bp
Band	19|19 C1	End	28,891,360 bp
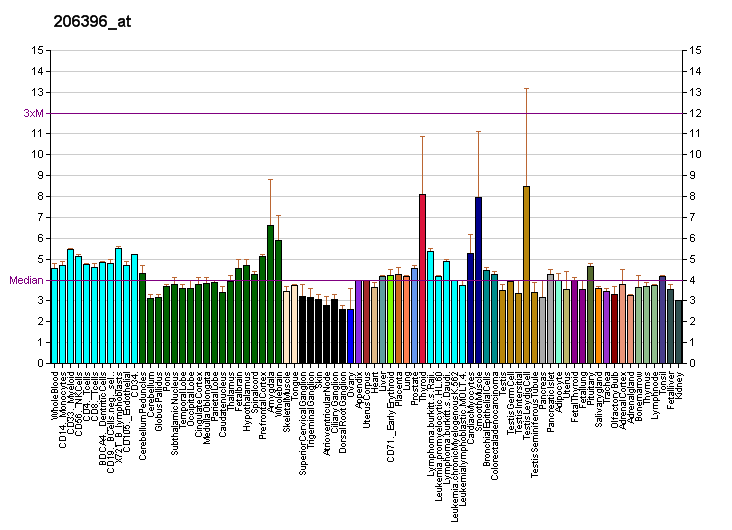

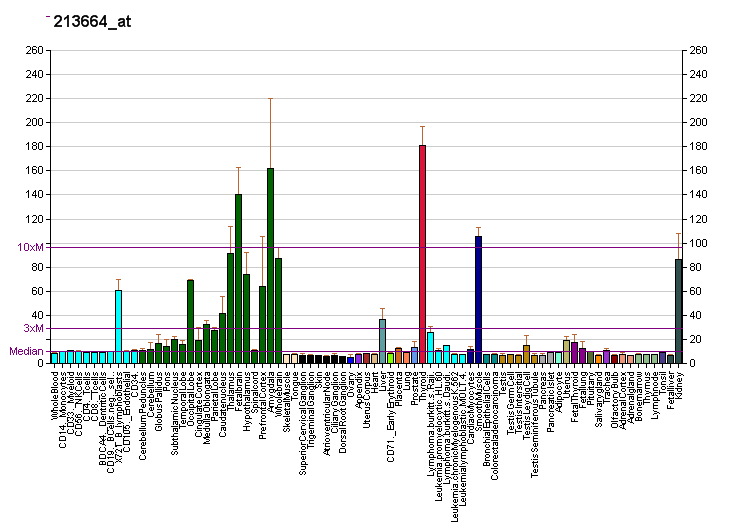
RNA expression pattern
Bgee	Human / Mouse (ortholog); Top expressed in: corpus epididymis; jejunal mucosa; mucosa of ileum; kidney tubule; pancreatic ductal cell; duodenum; decidua; lower lobe of lung; postcentral gyrus; endothelial cell / Top expressed in: retinal pigment epithelium; subiculum; right kidney; lateral geniculate nucleus; human kidney; lumbar subsegment of spinal cord; medial geniculate nucleus; Region I of hippocampus proper; proximal tubule; lateral septal nucleus; More reference expression data
BioGPS	More reference expression data
Gene ontology
Molecular function	cysteine transmembrane transporter activity; protein binding; symporter activity; L-glutamate transmembrane transporter activity; glutamate binding; amino acid transmembrane transporter activity; high-affinity glutamate transmembrane transporter activity; chloride transmembrane transporter activity; glutamate:sodium symporter activity; metal ion binding
Cellular component	integral component of membrane; membrane; plasma membrane; apical plasma membrane; extracellular exosome; integral component of plasma membrane; early endosome membrane; recycling endosome membrane
Biological process	chemical synaptic transmission; D-aspartate import across plasma membrane; ion transport; positive regulation of heart rate; glutamate secretion; cysteine transport; protein homooligomerization; L-glutamate import; L-glutamate transmembrane transport; cysteine transmembrane transport; L-aspartate import across plasma membrane; chloride transmembrane transport; L-glutamate import across plasma membrane; amino acid transport; transport
Sources:Amigo / QuickGO
Orthologs
Databases	NCBI: entry; OMA: entry
Species	Human	Mouse
Entrez	6505	20510
Ensembl	ENSG00000106688	ENSMUSG00000024935
UniProt	P43005	P51906
RefSeq (mRNA)	NM_004170	NM_009199
RefSeq (protein)	NP_004161	NP_033225
Location (UCSC)	Chr 9: 4.49 – 4.59 Mb	Chr 19: 28.81 – 28.89 Mb
PubMed search
- Wikidata
View/Edit Human	View/Edit Mouse

Excitatory amino acid transporter 3 (EAAT3) is a protein that in humans is encoded by the SLC1A1 gene.

== Tissue distribution ==
EAAT3 is expressed on the plasma membrane of neurons, specifically on the dendrites and axon terminals.

== Function ==
Excitatory amino acid transporter 3 is a member of the high-affinity glutamate transporters which plays an essential role in transporting glutamate across plasma membranes in neurons. In the brain, excitatory amino acid transporters are crucial in terminating the postsynaptic action of the neurotransmitter glutamate, and in maintaining extracellular glutamate concentrations below neurotoxic levels. EAAT3 also transports aspartate, and mutations in this gene are thought to cause dicarboxylic aminoaciduria, also known as glutamate-aspartate transport defect. EAAT3 is also the major route of neuronal cysteine uptake. Cysteine is a component of the major antioxidant glutathione, and mice lacking EAAT3 exhibit reduced levels of glutathione in neurons, increased oxidative stress, and age-dependent loss of neurons, especially neurons of the substantia nigra. A meta-analysis identified a small but significant association between a polymorphism of the gene SLC1A1 and obsessive–compulsive disorder.

== Interactions ==
SLC1A1 has been shown to interact with ARL6IP5.

== See also ==
- Excitatory amino acid transporter
- Glutamate transporter
- Solute carrier family
