= Excitatory amino acid transporter 2 =

Protein found in humans

SLC1A2

Identifiers
- Aliases: SLC1A2, EAAT2, GLT-1, HBGT, solute carrier family 1 member 2, EIEE41, DEE41
- External IDs: OMIM: 600300; MGI: 101931; GeneCards: SLC1A2

Gene location (Human)
Chr.	Chromosome 11 (human)
Band	11p13	Start	35,251,205 bp
Band	11p13	End	35,420,063 bp

Gene location (Mouse)
Chr.	Chromosome 2 (mouse)
Band	2 E2|2 54.13 cM	Start	102,489,004 bp
Band	2 E2|2 54.13 cM	End	102,621,129 bp
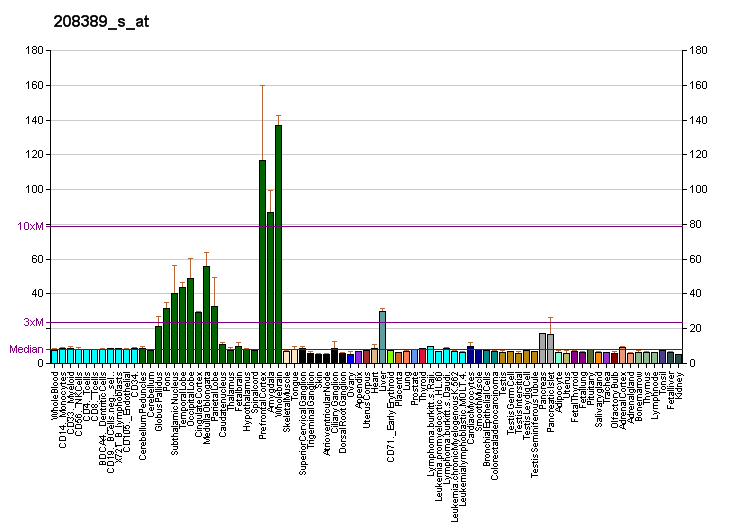
RNA expression pattern
Bgee	Human / Mouse (ortholog); Top expressed in: endothelial cell; Brodmann area 23; entorhinal cortex; external globus pallidus; middle temporal gyrus; parietal lobe; postcentral gyrus; internal globus pallidus; nucleus accumbens; caudate nucleus / Top expressed in: lateral septal nucleus; olfactory tubercle; subiculum; anterior amygdaloid area; globus pallidus; deep cerebellar nuclei; mammillary body; medial dorsal nucleus; Rostral migratory stream; medial geniculate nucleus; More reference expression data
BioGPS	More reference expression data
Gene ontology
Molecular function	anion transmembrane transporter activity; protein binding; symporter activity; L-glutamate transmembrane transporter activity; amino acid transmembrane transporter activity; glutamate:sodium symporter activity; high-affinity glutamate transmembrane transporter activity; metal ion binding
Cellular component	integral component of membrane; membrane; plasma membrane; cell surface; axon; axolemma; integral component of plasma membrane; glutamatergic synapse; integral component of presynaptic membrane
Biological process	cellular response to extracellular stimulus; chemical synaptic transmission; positive regulation of glucose import; response to amino acid; response to light stimulus; multicellular organism growth; D-aspartate import across plasma membrane; ion transport; nervous system development; glutamate secretion; telencephalon development; anion transmembrane transport; adult behavior; response to wounding; multicellular organism aging; visual behavior; protein homotrimerization; L-glutamate import across plasma membrane; amino acid transport; L-glutamate transmembrane transport; neurotransmitter reuptake
Sources:Amigo / QuickGO
Orthologs
Databases	NCBI: entry; OMA: entry
Species	Human	Mouse
Entrez	6506	20511
Ensembl	ENSG00000110436	ENSMUSG00000005089
UniProt	P43004	P43006
RefSeq (mRNA)	NM_001195728; NM_001252652; NM_004171	NM_001077514; NM_001077515; NM_011393; NM_001361018
RefSeq (protein)	NP_001182657; NP_001239581; NP_004162	NP_001070982; NP_001070983; NP_035523; NP_001347947
Location (UCSC)	Chr 11: 35.25 – 35.42 Mb	Chr 2: 102.49 – 102.62 Mb
PubMed search
- Wikidata
View/Edit Human	View/Edit Mouse

Excitatory amino acid transporter 2 (EAAT2) also known as solute carrier family 1 member 2 (SLC1A2) and glutamate transporter 1 (GLT-1) is a protein that in humans is encoded by the SLC1A2 gene. Alternatively spliced transcript variants of this gene have been described, but their full-length nature is not known.

== Function ==
SLC1A2 / EAAT2 is a member of a family of the solute carrier family of proteins. The membrane-bound protein is the principal transporter that clears the excitatory neurotransmitter glutamate from the extracellular space at synapses in the central nervous system. Glutamate clearance is necessary for proper synaptic activation and to prevent neuronal damage from excessive activation of glutamate receptors. EAAT2 is responsible for over 90% of glutamate reuptake within the brain.

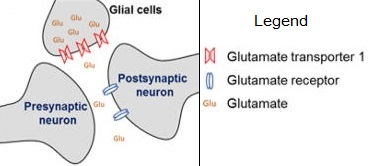
This diagram shows the tissue distribution of glutamate transporter 1 (EAAT2) in the brain.

== Clinical significance ==
Mutations in and decreased expression of this protein are associated with amyotrophic lateral sclerosis (ALS). The drug riluzole approved for the treatment of ALS upregulates EAAT2.

Ceftriaxone, an antibiotic, has been shown to induce/enhance the expression of EAAT2, resulting in reduced glutamate activity. Ceftriaxone has been shown to reduce the development and expression of tolerance to opiates and other drugs of abuse. EAAT2 may possess an important role in drug addiction and tolerance to addictive drugs.

Upregulation of EAAT2 (GLT-1) causes impairment of prepulse inhibition, a sensory gating deficit present in schizophrenics and schizophrenia animal models. Some antipsychotics have been shown to reduce the expression of EAAT2.

== Interactions ==
SLC1A2 has been shown to interact with AJUBA.

== As a drug target ==
EAAT2/GLT-1, being the most abundant subtype of glutamate transporter in the CNS, plays a key role in regulation of glutamate neurotransmission. Dysfunction of EAAT2 has been correlated with various pathologies such as traumatic brain injury, stroke, Amyotrophic lateral sclerosis (ALS), Alzheimer's disease, among others. Therefore, activators of the function or enhancers of the expression of EAAT2/GLT-1 could serve as a potential therapy for these conditions. Translational activators of EAAT2/GLT-1, such as ceftriaxone and LDN/OSU-0212320, have been described to have significant protective effects in animal models of ALS and epilepsy. In addition, pharmacological activators of the activity of EAAT2/GLT-1 have been explored for decades and are currently emerging as promising tools for neuroprotection, having potential advantages over expression activators.

DL-TBOA, WAY-213,613, and dihydrokainic acid are known inhibitors of the protein, and function as excitotoxins. They can be considered a novel class of nerve agent toxins, inducing toxic levels of glutamate through transport inhibition in a manner analogous to the effect of sarin on cholinesterase. Antidotes for such a poisoning have never been formally tested for efficacy and are not readily available for medical use.

Addiction to certain drugs (e.g., cocaine, heroin, alcohol, and nicotine) is correlated with a persistent reduction in the expression of EAAT2 in the nucleus accumbens (NAcc); the reduced expression of EAAT2 in this region is implicated in addictive drug-seeking behavior. In particular, the long-term dysregulation of glutamate neurotransmission in the NAcc of addicts is associated with an increase in vulnerability to relapse after re-exposure to the addictive drug or its associated drug cues. Drugs which help to normalize the expression of EAAT2 in this region, such as N-acetylcysteine, have been proposed as an adjunct therapy for the treatment of addiction to cocaine, nicotine, alcohol, and other drugs.

== See also ==
- Glutamate transporter
- Solute carrier family
