= Excitatory amino acid transporter 1 =

Protein found in humans

SLC1A3

Identifiers
- Aliases: SLC1A3, EA6, EAAT1, GLAST, GLAST1, solute carrier family 1 member 3
- External IDs: OMIM: 600111; MGI: 99917; GeneCards: SLC1A3

Gene location (Human)
Chr.	Chromosome 5 (human)
Band	5p13.2	Start	36,596,588 bp
Band	5p13.2	End	36,688,334 bp

Gene location (Mouse)
Chr.	Chromosome 15 (mouse)
Band	15 A1|15 3.82 cM	Start	8,663,608 bp
Band	15 A1|15 3.82 cM	End	8,740,248 bp
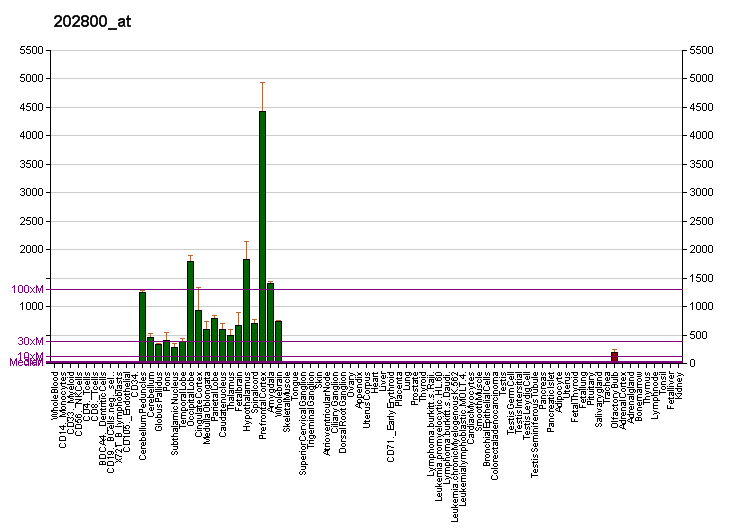
RNA expression pattern
Bgee	Human / Mouse (ortholog); Top expressed in: ventricular zone; dorsal motor nucleus of vagus nerve; internal globus pallidus; external globus pallidus; Region I of hippocampus proper; inferior olivary nucleus; nucleus accumbens; middle temporal gyrus; optic nerve; amygdala / Top expressed in: lobe of cerebellum; cerebellar vermis; lateral septal nucleus; paraventricular nucleus of hypothalamus; arcuate nucleus; globus pallidus; dorsomedial hypothalamic nucleus; lateral hypothalamus; ventromedial nucleus; anterior amygdaloid area; More reference expression data
BioGPS	More reference expression data
Gene ontology
Molecular function	amino acid binding; symporter activity; glutamate binding; L-glutamate transmembrane transporter activity; amino acid transmembrane transporter activity; high-affinity glutamate transmembrane transporter activity; acidic amino acid transmembrane transporter activity; glutamate:sodium symporter activity; metal ion binding
Cellular component	integral component of membrane; cell projection; membrane; plasma membrane; cell surface; soma; neuron projection; cell periphery; integral component of plasma membrane
Biological process	chemical synaptic transmission; gamma-aminobutyric acid biosynthetic process; glutamate biosynthetic process; neuromuscular process controlling balance; response to light stimulus; cell morphogenesis involved in neuron differentiation; cranial nerve development; response to antibiotic; ion transport; hearing; glutamate secretion; auditory behavior; neurotransmitter uptake; response to wounding; positive regulation of synaptic transmission; glutamate metabolic process; L-glutamate import; amino acid transport; D-aspartate import across plasma membrane; potassium ion transmembrane transport; L-glutamate import across plasma membrane; L-aspartate import across plasma membrane; chloride transmembrane transport; L-glutamate transmembrane transport
Sources:Amigo / QuickGO
Orthologs
Databases	NCBI: entry; OMA: entry
Species	Human	Mouse
Entrez	6507	20512
Ensembl	ENSG00000079215	ENSMUSG00000005360
UniProt	P43003	P56564
RefSeq (mRNA)	NM_001166695; NM_001166696; NM_001289939; NM_001289940; NM_004172	NM_148938
RefSeq (protein)	NP_001160167; NP_001160168; NP_001276868; NP_001276869; NP_004163	NP_683740
Location (UCSC)	Chr 5: 36.6 – 36.69 Mb	Chr 15: 8.66 – 8.74 Mb
PubMed search
- Wikidata
View/Edit Human	View/Edit Mouse

Excitatory amino acid transporter 1 (EAAT1) is a protein that, in humans, is encoded by the SLC1A3 gene. EAAT1 is also often called the GLutamate ASpartate Transporter 1 (GLAST-1).

EAAT1 is predominantly expressed in the plasma membrane, allowing it to remove glutamate from the extracellular space. It has also been localized in the inner mitochondrial membrane as part of the malate-aspartate shuttle.

== Mechanism ==
EAAT1 functions in vivo as a homotrimer. EAAT1 mediates the transport of glutamic and aspartic acid with the cotransport of three Na^{+} and one H^{+} cations and counter transport of one K^{+} cation. This co-transport coupling (or symport) allows the transport of glutamate into cells against a concentration gradient.

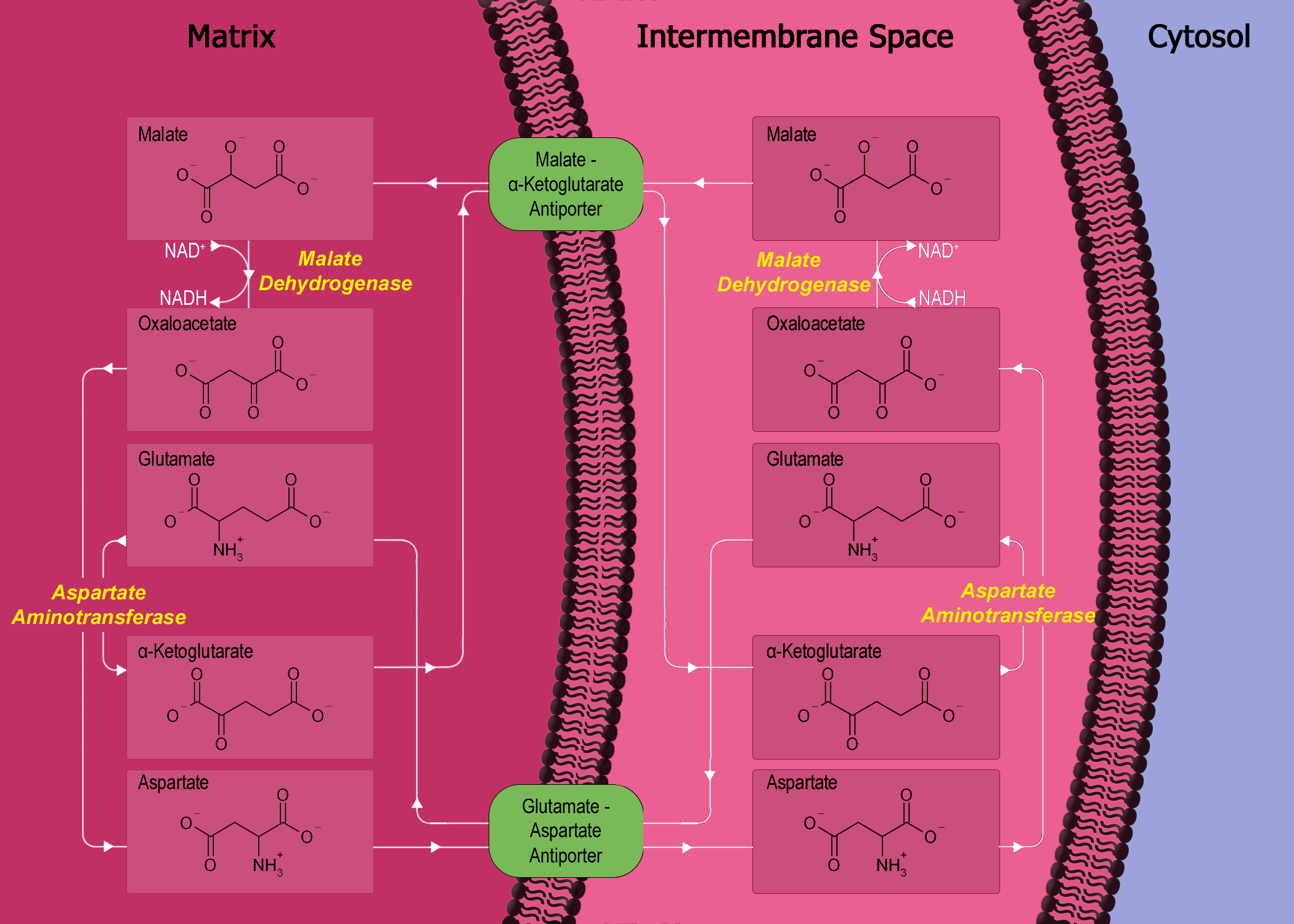
"Diagram Illustrating the Malate-Aspartate Shuttle Pathway". (Glutamate aspartate transporter labeled at bottom center.)

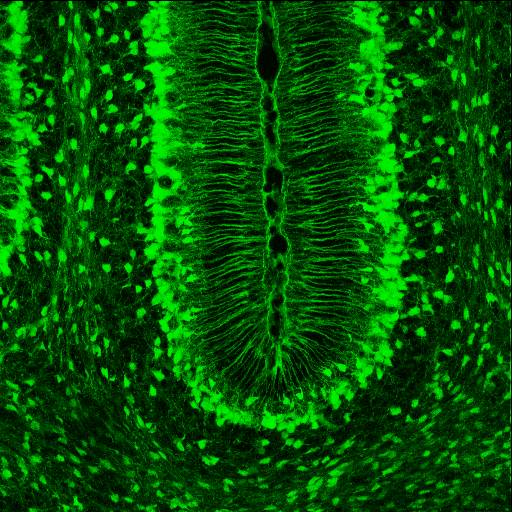
Expression of SLC1A3 in the Bergmann glia fibers. Mouse brain at 7th postnatal day, sagittal section; GENSAT database.

== Tissue distribution ==
EAAT1 is expressed throughout the CNS, and is highly expressed in astrocytes and Bergmann glia in the cerebellum. In the retina, EAAT1 is expressed in Muller cells. EAAT1 is also expressed in a number of other tissues including cardiac myocytes.

== Clinical significance ==
It is associated with type 6 episodic ataxia. EAAT1 expression may also be associated with osteoarthritis.

== Pharmacology ==
DL-threo-beta-benzyloxyaspartate (TBOA) is an inhibitor of the excitatory amino acid transporters.

Selective inhibitors for EAAT1 have recently been discovered based on 25 combinations of substitutions at the 4 and 7 positions of 2-amino-5-oxo-5,6,7,8-tetrahydro-4H-chromene-3-carbonitril.
