= George A. M. Cross =

George Alan Martin Cross PhD FRS (born 27 September 1942) is a British molecular parasitologist. He was educated at Cheadle Hulme School and Downing College, University of Cambridge (BA 1964) and the Department of Biochemistry, University of Cambridge (PhD 1968). From 1969 to 1977 he rose through the ranks from postdoctoral fellow to tenured scientist in the Medical Research Council's Biochemical Parasitology Unit at the Molteno Institute, University of Cambridge. In 1977 he took up the position of Head of the Department of Immunochemistry, which expanded to become the company's center for Molecular Biology, at the Wellcome Foundation's Research Laboratories in Beckenham, Kent. He was appointed André and Bella Meyer Professor of Molecular Parasitology at Rockefeller University, New York in 1982 and has been Professor Emeritus since 2013.

In recognition of his work on the molecular biology of immune evasion in African Trypanosomes he received several honors, including the 1978 Fleming Prize of the Society for General Microbiology, the 1983 Chalmers Medal of the Royal Society of Tropical Medicine and Hygiene, and the 1984 Paul Ehrlich and Ludwig Darmstaedter Prize (jointly with Prof. Piet Borst). He was elected as a Fellow of the Royal Society in 1984. He was honored as the 1986 Shipley Lecturer at the Harvard Medical School, and with the Leeuwenhoek Medal of The Royal Society in 1998. In 2012 he was made an Honorary Fellow of the International Society of Protistologists.

Cross was the first to identify, purify and characterize the variant surface glycoproteins (VSGs) of trypanosomes, a class of surface molecules through which trypanosomes can indefinitely evade the mammalian immune system, which has foiled all attempts to immunize against African Sleeping Sickness. Subsequent cloning of the genes encoding VSGs, in collaboration with members of the Amsterdam laboratory of Prof. Piet Borst, led to a long-term exploration of the molecular, cellular and genetic basis of antigenic variation in the Cross laboratories and those of many other investigators, including some of his scientific descendants. Work at the Wellcome Labs included determining the first complete VSG amino acid and gene sequences, which, incidentally, proved for the first time that the ancient and differently evolved Trypanosomatidae branch of the eukaryotic evolutionary tree used the same genetic code as more highly evolved organisms. These studies led to discoveries with repercussions beyond the realm of VSGs, most importantly the discovery of RNA trans-splicing and glycosylphosphatidylinositol (GPI) anchoring of surface-membrane glycoproteins, which is used throughout eukaryotic species, including in humans.

Other pioneering, if sometimes mundane, work led to the first cultivation of any developmental stage of Trypanosoma brucei in a defined medium, followed by a collaboration with scientists at the International Laboratory for Research in Animal Diseases, in Nairobi, Kenya, to grow the animal-infective forms of the parasite in vitro, that led to the first system in which the infective forms could be propagated in axenic (feeder-cell-free) culture. The latter result was somewhat serendipitous, resulting from the quick recognition of an initial error in formulating a culture medium. These and other methodological advances, as is frequently the case in the advancement of most areas of the biological sciences, were crucial to furthering trypanosome research, especially in developing methods that opened the way for the genetic exploration of many aspects of trypanosome biology.

Recognizing that chromatin structure and histones could be important in the regulation of mono-allelic VSG expression, the Rockefeller laboratory embarked on a series of projects directed at identifying and investigating unique aspects of trypanosome histones and their modifications. As biology progressed into the era of large-scale genome sequencing, so did work on trypanosomes and VSGs.

Cross's 1977 move to the Wellcome Laboratories, with the resources it provided, was strongly motivated by his desire to extend his research to the clinically more important malaria parasite, which led to the isolation of surface molecules and the genes encoding them that opened up the potential to develop a vaccine for malaria, which was once again thwarted by that parasite's facility for antigenic variation.

Cross has been an editor and a member of the editorial boards of a wide range of scientific journals, and a consultant to national and global companies and non-profit organizations. In 2005, to support scientific exchange within the widening field of trypanosome biology, he founded a biennial Kinetoplastid Molecular Cell Biology Meeting that is hosted by the Marine Biological Laboratory in Woods Hole MA. For many years, since its inception by John David in 1980, he participated in the Biology of Parasitism: Modern Approaches summer course in Woods Hole, including giving the inaugural lecture and laboratory class in the course.
