= List of MeSH codes (D12.776.395) =

The following is a partial list of the "D" codes for Medical Subject Headings (MeSH), as defined by the United States National Library of Medicine (NLM).

This list covers glycoproteins. For other protein-related codes, see List of MeSH codes (D12.776).

Codes before these are found at List of MeSH codes (D12.776) § MeSH D12.776.377.856. Codes following these are found at List of MeSH codes (D12.776) § MeSH D12.776.402. For other MeSH codes, see List of MeSH codes.

The source for this content is the set of 2006 MeSH Trees from the NLM.

== MeSH D12.776.395 – glycoproteins ==
=== MeSH D12.776.395.240 – colony-stimulating factors ===
==== MeSH D12.776.395.240.075 – colony-stimulating factors, recombinant ====
- MeSH D12.776.395.240.075.350 – granulocyte colony stimulating factor, recombinant
- MeSH D12.776.395.240.075.350.275 – filgrastim
- MeSH D12.776.395.240.075.375 – granulocyte macrophage colony-stimulating factors, recombinant

==== MeSH D12.776.395.240.150 – erythropoietin ====
- MeSH D12.776.395.240.150.250 – erythropoietin, recombinant
- MeSH D12.776.395.240.150.250.250 – epoetin alfa

==== MeSH D12.776.395.240.200 – granulocyte colony-stimulating factor ====
- MeSH D12.776.395.240.200.375 – granulocyte colony stimulating factor, recombinant
- MeSH D12.776.395.240.200.375.275 – filgrastim

==== MeSH D12.776.395.240.300 – granulocyte-macrophage colony-stimulating factor ====
- MeSH D12.776.395.240.300.275 – granulocyte macrophage colony-stimulating factors, recombinant

=== MeSH D12.776.395.550 – membrane glycoproteins ===
==== MeSH D12.776.395.550.020 – atp-binding cassette transporters ====
- MeSH D12.776.395.550.020.610 – p-glycoproteins
- MeSH D12.776.395.550.020.610.610 – p-glycoprotein

==== MeSH D12.776.395.550.200 – cell adhesion molecules ====
- MeSH D12.776.395.550.200.065 – antigens, cd22
- MeSH D12.776.395.550.200.098 – antigens, cd24
- MeSH D12.776.395.550.200.131 – antigens, cd31
- MeSH D12.776.395.550.200.170 – antigens, cd146
- MeSH D12.776.395.550.200.175 – antigens, cd164
- MeSH D12.776.395.550.200.200 – cadherins
- MeSH D12.776.395.550.200.200.500 – desmosomal cadherins
- MeSH D12.776.395.550.200.200.500.249 – desmocollins
- MeSH D12.776.395.550.200.200.500.500 – desmogleins
- MeSH D12.776.395.550.200.200.500.500.500 – desmoglein 1
- MeSH D12.776.395.550.200.200.500.500.625 – desmoglein 2
- MeSH D12.776.395.550.200.200.500.500.750 – desmoglein 3
- MeSH D12.776.395.550.200.210 – carcinoembryonic antigen
- MeSH D12.776.395.550.200.230 – cd4 immunoadhesins
- MeSH D12.776.395.550.200.250 – cell adhesion molecules, neuronal
- MeSH D12.776.395.550.200.250.150 – cell adhesion molecules, neuron-glia
- MeSH D12.776.395.550.200.250.150.050 – activated-leukocyte cell adhesion molecule
- MeSH D12.776.395.550.200.250.500 – myelin p0 protein
- MeSH D12.776.395.550.200.250.520 – neural cell adhesion molecules
- MeSH D12.776.395.550.200.250.520.156 – antigens, cd56
- MeSH D12.776.395.550.200.250.520.578 – neural cell adhesion molecule L1
- MeSH D12.776.395.550.200.275 – integrin alphaxbeta2
- MeSH D12.776.395.550.200.450 – intercellular adhesion molecule-1
- MeSH D12.776.395.550.200.625 – receptors, lymphocyte homing
- MeSH D12.776.395.550.200.625.144 – antigens, cd44
- MeSH D12.776.395.550.200.625.347 – integrin alpha4beta1
- MeSH D12.776.395.550.200.625.550 – lymphocyte function-associated antigen-1
- MeSH D12.776.395.550.200.625.903 – l-selectin
- MeSH D12.776.395.550.200.700 – selectins
- MeSH D12.776.395.550.200.700.300 – e-selectin
- MeSH D12.776.395.550.200.700.510 – l-selectin
- MeSH D12.776.395.550.200.700.775 – p-selectin
- MeSH D12.776.395.550.200.920 – vascular cell adhesion molecule-1

==== MeSH D12.776.395.550.550 – lysosome-associated membrane glycoproteins ====
- MeSH D12.776.395.550.550.500 – lysosomal-associated membrane protein 1
- MeSH D12.776.395.550.550.750 – lysosomal-associated membrane protein 2

==== MeSH D12.776.395.550.625 – platelet membrane glycoproteins ====
- MeSH D12.776.395.550.625.136 – antigens, cd36
- MeSH D12.776.395.550.625.298 – integrin alpha2beta1
- MeSH D12.776.395.550.625.379 – integrin alpha5beta1
- MeSH D12.776.395.550.625.419 – integrin alpha6beta1
- MeSH D12.776.395.550.625.439 – integrin alphavbeta3
- MeSH D12.776.395.550.625.449 – lysosomal-associated membrane protein 1
- MeSH D12.776.395.550.625.460 – platelet glycoprotein gpib-ix complex
- MeSH D12.776.395.550.625.785 – platelet glycoprotein gpiib-iiia complex
- MeSH D12.776.395.550.625.800 – receptors, thrombin
- MeSH D12.776.395.550.625.800.780 – platelet glycoprotein gpib-ix complex
- MeSH D12.776.395.550.625.800.790 – receptor, par-1
- MeSH D12.776.395.550.625.800.800 – thrombomodulin
- MeSH D12.776.395.550.625.905 – p-selectin

==== MeSH D12.776.395.550.895 – thrombospondins ====
- MeSH D12.776.395.550.895.800 – thrombospondin 1

=== MeSH D12.776.395.560 – mucoproteins ===
==== MeSH D12.776.395.560.631 – mucins ====
- MeSH D12.776.395.560.631.115 – ca-15-3 antigen
- MeSH D12.776.395.560.631.300 – gastric mucin
- MeSH D12.776.395.560.631.650 – sialomucins
- MeSH D12.776.395.560.631.650.143 – antigens, cd43
- MeSH D12.776.395.560.631.650.264 – antigens, cd164

=== MeSH D12.776.395.970 – vitronectin ===
The list continues at List of MeSH codes (D12.776) § MeSH D12.776.402.
