= Subtelomere =

DNA segments

Subtelomeres are segments of DNA between telomeric caps and chromatin.

== Structure ==
Telomeres are specialized protein–DNA constructs present at the ends of eukaryotic chromosomes, which prevent them from degradation and end-to-end chromosomal fusion. Most vertebrate telomeric DNA consists of long (TTAGGG)n repeats of variable length, often around 3-20kb. Subtelomeres are segments of DNA between telomeric caps and chromatin. In vertebrates, each chromosome has two subtelomeres immediately adjacent to the long (TTAGGG)n repeats. Subtelomeres are considered to be the most distal (farthest from the centromere) region of unique DNA on a chromosome, and they are unusually dynamic and variable mosaics of multichromosomal blocks of sequence. The subtelomeres of such diverse species as humans, Plasmodium falciparum, Drosophila melanogaster, and Saccharomyces cerevisiae are structurally similar in that they are composed of various repeated elements, but the extent of the subtelomeres and the sequence of the elements vary greatly among organisms. In yeast (S. cerevisiae), subtelomeres are composed of two domains: the proximal and distal (telomeric) domains. The two domains differ in sequence content and extent of homology to other chromosome ends, and they are often separated by a stretch of degenerate telomere repeats (TTAGGG) and an element called 'core X', which is found at all chromosome ends and contains an autonomously replicating sequence (ARS) and an ABF1 binding site. The proximal domain is composed of variable interchromosomal duplications (<1-30 kb); this region can contain genes such Pho, Mel, and Mal. The distal domain is composed of 0-4 tandem copies of the highly conserved Y' element; the number and chromosomal distribution of Y′ elements varies among yeast strains. Between the core X and the Y' element or the core X and TTAGGG sequence there is often a set of 4 subtelomeric repeats elements (STR): STR-A, STR-B, STR-C and STR-D which consists of multiple copies of the vertebrate telomeric motif TTAGGG. This two-domain structure is remarkably similar to the subtelomere structure in human chromosomes 20p, 4q and 18p in which proximal and distal subtelomeric domains are separated by a stretch of degenerate TTAGGG repeats, but the picture that emerges from studies of the subtelomeres of other human chromosomes indicates that the two-domain model does not apply universally.

== Properties ==
This structure with repeated sequences is responsible for frequent duplication events, which create new genes, and recombination events, at the origin of combination diversity. These properties generate diversity at an individual scale and therefore contribute to adaptation of organisms to their environments. For example, in Plasmodium falciparum during interphase of the erythrocytic stage, the chromosomic extremities are gathered at the cell nucleus periphery, where they undergo frequent deletion and telomere position effect (TPE). This event, in addition to expansion and deletion of subtelomeric repeats, gives rise to chromosome size polymorphisms and thus, subtelomeres undergo epigenetic and genetic controls. Because of the properties of subtelomeres, Plasmodium falciparum evades host immunity by varying the antigenic and adhesive character of infected erythrocytes (see Subtelomeric transcripts).

== Variations ==
Variation of subtelomeric regions are mostly variation on STRs, due to recombination of large-scale stretches delimited by (TTAGGG)n-like repeated sequences, which play an important role in recombination and transcription. Haplotype (DNA sequence variants) and length differences are therefore observed between individuals.

== Subtelomeric transcripts ==
Subtelomeric transcripts largely consist of either pseudogenes (transcribed genes producing RNA sequences not translated into protein) or gene families. In humans, they code for olfactory receptors, immunoglobulin heavy chains, and zinc-finger proteins. In other species, several parasites such as Plasmodium and Trypanosoma brucei have developed sophisticated evasion mechanisms to adapt to the hostile environment posed by the host, such as exposing variable surface antigens to escape the immune system. Genes coding for surface antigens in these organisms are located at subtelomeric regions, and it has been speculated that this preferred location facilitates gene switching and expression, and the generation of new variants. For example, the genes belonging to the var family in Plasmodium falciparum (agent of malaria) are mostly localized in subtelomeric regions. Antigenic variation is orchestrated by epigenetic factors, including monoallelic var transcription at separate spatial domains at the nuclear periphery (nuclear pore), differential histone marks on otherwise identical var genes, and var silencing mediated by telomeric heterochromatin. Other factors such as non-coding RNA produced in subtelomeric regions adjacent or within var genes may contribute as well to antigenic variation. In Trypanosoma brucei (agent of sleeping sickness), variable surface glycoprotein (VSG) antigenic variation is a relevant mechanism used by the parasite to evade the host immune system. VSG expression is exclusively subtelomeric and occurs either by in situ activation of a silent VSG gene or by DNA rearrangement that inserts an internal silent copy of a VSG gene into an active telomeric expression site. To contrast with Plasmodium falciparum, in Trypanosoma brucei, antigenic variation is orchestrated by epigenetic and genetic factors.

In Pneumocystis jirovecii major surface glycoprotein (MSG) gene family cause antigenic variation. MSG genes are like boxes at chromosome ends, and only the MSG gene at the unique locus UCS (upstream conserved sequence) is transcribed. Different MSG genes can occupy the expression site (UCS), suggesting that recombination can take a gene from a pool of silent donors and install it at the expression site, possibly via crossovers, activating transcription of a new MSG gene, and changing the surface antigen of Pneumocystis jirovecii. Switching at the expression site is probably facilitated by the subtelomeric locations of expressed and silent MSG genes. A second subtelomeric gene family, MSR, is not strictly regulated at the transcriptional level, but may contribute to phenotypic diversity. Antigenic variation in P. jirovecii is dominated by genetic regulation.

== Pathologic implication ==
Loss of telomeric DNA through repeated cycles of cell division is associated with senescence or somatic cell aging. In contrast, germ line and cancer cells possess an enzyme, telomerase, which prevents telomere degradation and maintains telomere integrity, causing these types of cells to be very long-lived.

In humans, the role of subtelomere disorders is demonstrated in facioscapulohumeral muscular dystrophy (FSHD), Alzheimer's disease, epilepsy and peculiar syndromic diseases (malformation and mental retardation). For example, FSHD is associated with a deletion in the subtelomeric region of chromosome 4q. A series of 10 to >100 kb repeats is located in the normal 4q subtelomere, but FSHD patients have only 1–10 repeat units. This deletion is thought to cause disease owing to a position effect that influences the transcription of nearby genes, rather than through the loss of the repeat array itself.

== Advantages and effects ==
Subtelomeres are homologous to other subtelomeres that are located at different chromosomes and are a type of transposable element, DNA segments that can move around the genome. Although subtelomeres are pseudogenes and do not code for protein, they provide an evolutionary advantage by diversifying genes. The duplication, recombination, and deletion of subtelomeres allow for the creation of new genes and new chromosomal properties. The advantages of subtelomeres have been studied in different species such as Plasmodium falciparum, Drosophila melanogaster, and Saccharomyces cerevisiae, since they have similar genetic elements to humans, not accounting for length and sequence. Subtelomeres might have the same role in plants since the same advantage have been found in a common bean plant known as Phaseolus vulgaris.

Different varieties of subtelomeres are frequently rearranging during meiotic and mitotic recombination, indicating that subtelomeres are frequently shuffling, which causes new and rapid genetic changes in chromosomes. In Saccharomyces cerevisiae, 15kb region of chromosome 7L in subtelomeres maintained cell viability in the removal of telomerase, while the removal of the last 15kb increased chromosome senescence. The knockout of subtelomeres in fission yeast, Schizosaccharomyces pombe, cells does not impede mitosis and meiosis from occurring, indicating that subtelomeres are not necessary for cell division. They are not needed for the procession of mitosis and meiosis yet, subtelomeres take advantage of cellular DNA recombination. The knockout of subtelomeres in Schizosaccharomyces pombe cells does not affect the regulation of multiple stress responses, when treated with high doses of hydroxyurea, camptothecin, ultraviolet radiation, and thiabendazole. Knockout of Subtelomeres in Schizosaccharomyces pombe cells did not affect the length of telomeres, indicating that they play no role it the regulation of length. However, subtelomeres strongly influences the replication timing of telomeres. Knockout of subtelomeres in Schizosaccharomyces pombe cells after the loss of telomerase does not affect cell survival, indicating that subtelomeres are not necessary for cell survival. An explanation as to why subtelomeres are not necessary after the loss of telomerase is because the chromosomes can use intra or inter-chromosomal circularization or HAATI to maintain chromosomal stabilization. However, the use of inter-chromosomal circularization engenders chromosome instability by creating two centromeres in a single chromosome, causing chromosomal breakage during mitosis. In response to this, the chromosome could induce centromere inactivation to impede the formation of two centromeres, but this would induce heterochromatin formation in centromeres. Heterochromatin can be deleterious if it gets into a location that it is not supposed to be in. Subtelomeres are responsible to block heterochromatin from getting into the euchromatin region. Subtelomeres can mitigate the effects of heterochromatin invasion, by distributing heterochromatin around the ends of the subtelomeres. Without subtelomeres, heterochromatin would spread around the region of subtelomeres, getting too close to important genes. At this distance, heterochromatin can silence genes that are nearby, resulting in a higher sensitivity to osmotic stress.

Subtelomeres carry out essential functions with Shugoshin protein. Shugoshin is a centromere protein for chromosome segregation during meiosis and mitosis. There are two types of Shugoshin protein: SGOL1 and SGOL2. Sgo1 is only expressed in meiosis 1 for centromeric cohesion of the sister chromosomes, while Sgo2, expressed in meiosis and mitosis, is responsible for the segregation of chromosomes at centromeres in the M phase. In fission yeast, Sgo2 is localized not only in centromeres, but also in subtelomeres. Sgo2 interacts with subtelomeres during interphase; middle of the G2 phase and plays a major role in forming "knob", which is a highly condensed chromatin body. Sgo2 remains in subtelomeres, whose cells lack telomere DNA. Sgo2 represses the expression of subtelomeric genes that is in a different pass-way from the H3K9me3- Swi6-mediated heterochromatin. Sgo2 has also repressive effects for timing of subtelomeres replication by suppressing Sld3, a replication factor, at the start of the replication. Thus, Sgo2 regulate gene expressions and replication to ensure proper subtelomeric gene expression and replication timing.

== Analysis ==
Subtelomere analysis, especially sequencing and profiling of patient subtelomeres, is difficult because of the repeated sequences, length of stretches, and lack of databases on the topic.
