= List of MeSH codes (D12.776.543) =

The following is a partial list of the "D" codes for Medical Subject Headings (MeSH), as defined by the United States National Library of Medicine (NLM).

This list covers membrane proteins. For other protein-related codes, see List of MeSH codes (D12.776).

Codes before these are found at List of MeSH codes (D12.776) § MeSH D12.776.532.510.750. Codes following these are found at List of MeSH codes (D12.776) § MeSH D12.776.556. For other MeSH codes, see List of MeSH codes.

The source for this content is the set of 2006 MeSH Trees from the NLM.

== MeSH D12.776.543 – membrane proteins ==
=== MeSH D12.776.543.100 – bacterial outer membrane proteins ===
==== MeSH D12.776.543.100.050 – adhesins, bacterial ====
- MeSH D12.776.543.100.050.040 – adhesins, escherichia coli

=== MeSH D12.776.543.325 – heterotrimeric gtp-binding proteins ===
==== MeSH D12.776.543.325.100 – gtp-binding protein alpha subunits ====
- MeSH D12.776.543.325.100.100 – gtp-binding protein alpha subunits, g12-g13
- MeSH D12.776.543.325.100.200 – gtp-binding protein alpha subunits, gi-go
- MeSH D12.776.543.325.100.200.500 – gtp-binding protein alpha subunit, gi2
- MeSH D12.776.543.325.100.300 – gtp-binding protein alpha subunits, gq-g11
- MeSH D12.776.543.325.100.400 – gtp-binding protein alpha subunits, gs

=== MeSH D12.776.543.512 – membrane fusion proteins ===
==== MeSH D12.776.543.512.249 – snare proteins ====
- MeSH D12.776.543.512.249.500 – q-snare proteins
- MeSH D12.776.543.512.249.500.500 – qa-snare proteins
- MeSH D12.776.543.512.249.500.500.700 – syntaxin 1
- MeSH D12.776.543.512.249.500.500.750 – syntaxin 16
- MeSH D12.776.543.512.249.500.750 – qb-snare proteins
- MeSH D12.776.543.512.249.500.750.500 – synaptosomal-associated protein 25
- MeSH D12.776.543.512.249.500.875 – qc-snare proteins
- MeSH D12.776.543.512.249.500.875.500 – synaptosomal-associated protein 25
- MeSH D12.776.543.512.249.750 – r-snare proteins
- MeSH D12.776.543.512.249.750.500 – vesicle-associated membrane protein 1
- MeSH D12.776.543.512.249.750.750 – vesicle-associated membrane protein 2
- MeSH D12.776.543.512.249.750.875 – vesicle-associated membrane protein 3

==== MeSH D12.776.543.512.500 – viral fusion proteins ====
- MeSH D12.776.543.512.500.330 – hiv envelope protein gp41

=== MeSH D12.776.543.550 – membrane glycoproteins ===
==== MeSH D12.776.543.550.190 – antiporters ====
- MeSH D12.776.543.550.190.110 – anion exchange protein 1, erythrocyte
- MeSH D12.776.543.550.190.276 – chloride-bicarbonate antiporters
- MeSH D12.776.543.550.190.276.500 – anion exchange protein 1, erythrocyte
- MeSH D12.776.543.550.190.442 – potassium-hydrogen antiporters
- MeSH D12.776.543.550.190.775 – sodium-hydrogen antiporter

==== MeSH D12.776.543.550.192 – atp-binding cassette transporters ====
- MeSH D12.776.543.550.192.610 – p-glycoproteins
- MeSH D12.776.543.550.192.610.610 – p-glycoprotein

==== MeSH D12.776.543.550.200 – cell adhesion molecules ====
- MeSH D12.776.543.550.200.122 – antigens, cd22
- MeSH D12.776.543.550.200.124 – antigens, cd24
- MeSH D12.776.543.550.200.131 – antigens, cd31
- MeSH D12.776.543.550.200.140 – antigens, cd146
- MeSH D12.776.543.550.200.145 – antigens, cd164
- MeSH D12.776.543.550.200.200 – cadherins
- MeSH D12.776.543.550.200.200.500 – desmosomal cadherins
- MeSH D12.776.543.550.200.200.500.249 – desmocollins
- MeSH D12.776.543.550.200.200.500.500 – desmogleins
- MeSH D12.776.543.550.200.200.500.500.500 – desmoglein 1
- MeSH D12.776.543.550.200.200.500.500.625 – desmoglein 2
- MeSH D12.776.543.550.200.200.500.500.750 – desmoglein 3
- MeSH D12.776.543.550.200.210 – carcinoembryonic antigen
- MeSH D12.776.543.550.200.230 – CD4 immunoadhesins
- MeSH D12.776.543.550.200.250 – cell adhesion molecules, neuronal
- MeSH D12.776.543.550.200.250.150 – cell adhesion molecules, neuron-glia
- MeSH D12.776.543.550.200.250.150.050 – activated-leukocyte cell adhesion molecule
- MeSH D12.776.543.550.200.250.500 – myelin P0 protein
- MeSH D12.776.543.550.200.250.520 – neural cell adhesion molecules
- MeSH D12.776.543.550.200.250.520.156 – antigens, CD56
- MeSH D12.776.543.550.200.250.520.578 – neural cell adhesion molecule L1
- MeSH D12.776.543.550.200.275 – integrin alphaxbeta2
- MeSH D12.776.543.550.200.450 – intercellular adhesion molecule-1
- MeSH D12.776.543.550.200.625 – receptors, lymphocyte homing
- MeSH D12.776.543.550.200.625.144 – antigens, CD44
- MeSH D12.776.543.550.200.625.347 – integrin alpha4beta1
- MeSH D12.776.543.550.200.625.550 – lymphocyte function-associated antigen-1
- MeSH D12.776.543.550.200.625.903 – l-selectin
- MeSH D12.776.543.550.200.700 – selectins
- MeSH D12.776.543.550.200.700.300 – e-selectin
- MeSH D12.776.543.550.200.700.510 – l-selectin
- MeSH D12.776.543.550.200.700.775 – p-selectin
- MeSH D12.776.543.550.200.920 – vascular cell adhesion molecule-1

==== MeSH D12.776.543.550.425 – ion channels ====
- MeSH D12.776.543.550.425.150 – calcium channels
- MeSH D12.776.543.550.425.150.400 – calcium channels, l-type
- MeSH D12.776.543.550.425.150.585 – calcium channels, n-type
- MeSH D12.776.543.550.425.150.585.792 – calcium channels, p-type
- MeSH D12.776.543.550.425.150.585.826 – calcium channels, q-type
- MeSH D12.776.543.550.425.150.585.867 – calcium channels, r-type
- MeSH D12.776.543.550.425.150.720 – calcium channels, t-type
- MeSH D12.776.543.550.425.150.800 – ryanodine receptor calcium release channel
- MeSH D12.776.543.550.425.175 – chloride channels
- MeSH D12.776.543.550.425.175.125 – cystic fibrosis transmembrane conductance regulator
- MeSH D12.776.543.550.425.730 – porins
- MeSH D12.776.543.550.425.730.040 – aquaporins
- MeSH D12.776.543.550.425.730.040.249 – aquaglyceroporins
- MeSH D12.776.543.550.425.730.040.249.500 – aquaporin 3
- MeSH D12.776.543.550.425.730.040.249.750 – aquaporin 6
- MeSH D12.776.543.550.425.730.040.374 – aquaporin 1
- MeSH D12.776.543.550.425.730.040.437 – aquaporin 2
- MeSH D12.776.543.550.425.730.040.468 – aquaporin 4
- MeSH D12.776.543.550.425.730.040.484 – aquaporin 5
- MeSH D12.776.543.550.425.730.520 – voltage-dependent anion channels
- MeSH D12.776.543.550.425.730.520.500 – voltage-dependent anion channel 1
- MeSH D12.776.543.550.425.730.520.750 – voltage-dependent anion channel 2
- MeSH D12.776.543.550.425.750 – potassium channels
- MeSH D12.776.543.550.425.750.150 – potassium channels, calcium-activated
- MeSH D12.776.543.550.425.750.150.249 – intermediate-conductance calcium-activated potassium channels
- MeSH D12.776.543.550.425.750.150.500 – large-conductance calcium-activated potassium channels
- MeSH D12.776.543.550.425.750.150.500.500 – large-conductance calcium-activated potassium channel alpha subunits
- MeSH D12.776.543.550.425.750.150.500.750 – large-conductance calcium-activated potassium channel beta subunits
- MeSH D12.776.543.550.425.750.150.750 – small-conductance calcium-activated potassium channels
- MeSH D12.776.543.550.425.750.450 – potassium channels, inwardly rectifying
- MeSH D12.776.543.550.425.750.450.500 – g protein-coupled inwardly-rectifying potassium channels
- MeSH D12.776.543.550.425.750.850 – potassium channels, tandem pore domain
- MeSH D12.776.543.550.425.750.900 – potassium channels, voltage-gated
- MeSH D12.776.543.550.425.750.900.124 – delayed rectifier potassium channels
- MeSH D12.776.543.550.425.750.900.124.249 – kcnq potassium channels
- MeSH D12.776.543.550.425.750.900.124.249.500 – kcnq1 potassium channel
- MeSH D12.776.543.550.425.750.900.124.249.750 – kcnq2 potassium channel
- MeSH D12.776.543.550.425.750.900.124.249.875 – kcnq3 potassium channel
- MeSH D12.776.543.550.425.750.900.124.311 – kv1.1 potassium channel
- MeSH D12.776.543.550.425.750.900.124.342 – kv1.2 potassium channel
- MeSH D12.776.543.550.425.750.900.124.358 – kv1.3 potassium channel
- MeSH D12.776.543.550.425.750.900.124.374 – kv1.5 potassium channel
- MeSH D12.776.543.550.425.750.900.124.437 – kv1.6 potassium channel
- MeSH D12.776.543.550.425.750.900.124.500 – shab potassium channels
- MeSH D12.776.543.550.425.750.900.249 – ether-a-go-go potassium channels
- MeSH D12.776.543.550.425.750.900.500 – shaker superfamily of potassium channels
- MeSH D12.776.543.550.425.750.900.500.124 – kv1.1 potassium channel
- MeSH D12.776.543.550.425.750.900.500.186 – kv1.2 potassium channel
- MeSH D12.776.543.550.425.750.900.500.233 – kv1.4 potassium channel
- MeSH D12.776.543.550.425.750.900.500.241 – kv1.5 potassium channel
- MeSH D12.776.543.550.425.750.900.500.249 – shab potassium channels
- MeSH D12.776.543.550.425.750.900.500.625 – shal potassium channels
- MeSH D12.776.543.550.425.750.900.500.750 – shaw potassium channels
- MeSH D12.776.543.550.425.875 – sodium channels
- MeSH D12.776.543.585.400.901 – transient receptor potential channels

==== MeSH D12.776.543.550.527 – lysosome-associated membrane glycoproteins ====
- MeSH D12.776.543.550.527.500 – lysosomal-associated membrane protein 1
- MeSH D12.776.543.550.527.750 – lysosomal-associated membrane protein 2

==== MeSH D12.776.543.550.625 – platelet membrane glycoproteins ====
- MeSH D12.776.543.550.625.136 – antigens, cd36
- MeSH D12.776.543.550.625.298 – integrin alpha2beta1
- MeSH D12.776.543.550.625.379 – integrin alpha5beta1
- MeSH D12.776.543.550.625.419 – integrin alpha6beta1
- MeSH D12.776.543.550.625.439 – integrin alphavbeta3
- MeSH D12.776.543.550.625.449 – lysosomal-associated membrane protein 1
- MeSH D12.776.543.550.625.460 – platelet glycoprotein gpib-ix complex
- MeSH D12.776.543.550.625.785 – platelet glycoprotein gpiib-iiia complex
- MeSH D12.776.543.550.625.800 – receptors, thrombin
- MeSH D12.776.543.550.625.800.780 – platelet glycoprotein gpib-ix complex
- MeSH D12.776.543.550.625.800.790 – receptor, par-1
- MeSH D12.776.543.550.625.800.800 – thrombomodulin
- MeSH D12.776.543.550.625.905 – p-selectin

==== MeSH D12.776.543.550.895 – thrombospondins ====
- MeSH D12.776.543.550.895.800 – thrombospondin 1

=== MeSH D12.776.543.585 – membrane transport proteins ===
==== MeSH D12.776.543.585.100 – atp-binding cassette transporters ====
- MeSH D12.776.543.585.100.304 – multidrug resistance-associated proteins
- MeSH D12.776.543.585.100.610 – p-glycoproteins
- MeSH D12.776.543.585.100.610.500 – p-glycoprotein

==== MeSH D12.776.543.585.200 – amino acid transport systems ====
- MeSH D12.776.543.585.200.249 – amino acid transport systems, acidic
- MeSH D12.776.543.585.200.249.500 – amino acid transport system x-ag
- MeSH D12.776.543.585.200.249.500.500 – glutamate plasma membrane transport proteins
- MeSH D12.776.543.585.200.249.500.500.500 – excitatory amino acid transporter 1
- MeSH D12.776.543.585.200.249.500.500.750 – excitatory amino acid transporter 2
- MeSH D12.776.543.585.200.249.500.500.875 – excitatory amino acid transporter 3
- MeSH D12.776.543.585.200.249.500.500.937 – excitatory amino acid transporter 4
- MeSH D12.776.543.585.200.249.500.500.968 – excitatory amino acid transporter 5
- MeSH D12.776.543.585.200.374 – amino acid transport systems, basic
- MeSH D12.776.543.585.200.374.600 – amino acid transport system y+
- MeSH D12.776.543.585.200.374.600.200 – cationic amino acid transporter 1
- MeSH D12.776.543.585.200.374.600.300 – cationic amino acid transporter 2
- MeSH D12.776.543.585.200.374.750 – amino acid transport system y+l
- MeSH D12.776.543.585.200.374.750.500 – antigens, cd98
- MeSH D12.776.543.585.200.374.750.500.250 – antigens, cd98 heavy chain
- MeSH D12.776.543.585.200.374.750.500.500 – antigens, cd98 light chains
- MeSH D12.776.543.585.200.500 – amino acid transport systems, neutral
- MeSH D12.776.543.585.200.500.100 – amino acid transport system a
- MeSH D12.776.543.585.200.500.200 – amino acid transport system asc
- MeSH D12.776.543.585.200.500.500 – amino acid transport system l
- MeSH D12.776.543.585.200.500.500.500 – antigens, cd98
- MeSH D12.776.543.585.200.500.500.500.250 – antigens, cd98 heavy chain
- MeSH D12.776.543.585.200.500.500.500.500 – antigens, cd98 light chains
- MeSH D12.776.543.585.200.500.500.500.500.500 – large neutral amino acid-transporter 1
- MeSH D12.776.543.585.200.500.875 – glycine plasma membrane transport proteins

==== MeSH D12.776.543.585.300 – fatty acid transport proteins ====
- MeSH D12.776.543.585.300.500 – antigens, cd36

==== MeSH D12.776.543.585.400 – ion channels ====
- MeSH D12.776.543.585.400.150 – calcium channels
- MeSH D12.776.543.585.400.150.400 – calcium channels, l-type
- MeSH D12.776.543.585.400.150.585 – calcium channels, n-type
- MeSH D12.776.543.585.400.150.585.792 – calcium channels, p-type
- MeSH D12.776.543.585.400.150.585.826 – calcium channels, q-type
- MeSH D12.776.543.585.400.150.585.867 – calcium channels, r-type
- MeSH D12.776.543.585.400.150.720 – calcium channels, t-type
- MeSH D12.776.543.585.400.150.800 – ryanodine receptor calcium release channel
- MeSH D12.776.543.585.400.150.900 – trpp cation channels
- MeSH D12.776.543.585.400.175 – chloride channels
- MeSH D12.776.543.585.400.175.125 – cystic fibrosis transmembrane conductance regulator
- MeSH D12.776.543.585.400.730 – porins
- MeSH D12.776.543.585.400.730.040 – aquaporins
- MeSH D12.776.543.585.400.730.040.249 – aquaglyceroporins
- MeSH D12.776.543.585.400.730.040.249.500 – aquaporin 3
- MeSH D12.776.543.585.400.730.040.249.750 – aquaporin 6
- MeSH D12.776.543.585.400.730.040.436 – aquaporin 1
- MeSH D12.776.543.585.400.730.040.530 – aquaporin 2
- MeSH D12.776.543.585.400.730.040.577 – aquaporin 4
- MeSH D12.776.543.585.400.730.040.600 – aquaporin 5
- MeSH D12.776.543.585.400.730.520 – voltage-dependent anion channels
- MeSH D12.776.543.585.400.730.520.500 – voltage-dependent anion channel 1
- MeSH D12.776.543.585.400.730.520.750 – voltage-dependent anion channel 2
- MeSH D12.776.543.585.400.750 – potassium channels
- MeSH D12.776.543.585.400.750.150 – potassium channels, calcium-activated
- MeSH D12.776.543.585.400.750.150.249 – intermediate-conductance calcium-activated potassium channels
- MeSH D12.776.543.585.400.750.150.500 – large-conductance calcium-activated potassium channels
- MeSH D12.776.543.585.400.750.150.500.249 – large-conductance calcium-activated potassium channel alpha subunits
- MeSH D12.776.543.585.400.750.150.500.500 – large-conductance calcium-activated potassium channel beta subunits
- MeSH D12.776.543.585.400.750.150.750 – small-conductance calcium-activated potassium channels
- MeSH D12.776.543.585.400.750.450 – potassium channels, inwardly rectifying
- MeSH D12.776.543.585.400.750.450.500 – g protein-coupled inwardly-rectifying potassium channels
- MeSH D12.776.543.585.400.750.850 – potassium channels, tandem pore domain
- MeSH D12.776.543.585.400.750.900 – potassium channels, voltage-gated
- MeSH D12.776.543.585.400.750.900.124 – delayed rectifier potassium channels
- MeSH D12.776.543.585.400.750.900.124.249 – kcnq potassium channels
- MeSH D12.776.543.585.400.750.900.124.249.500 – kcnq1 potassium channel
- MeSH D12.776.543.585.400.750.900.124.249.750 – kcnq2 potassium channel
- MeSH D12.776.543.585.400.750.900.124.249.875 – kcnq3 potassium channel
- MeSH D12.776.543.585.400.750.900.124.374 – kv1.5 potassium channel
- MeSH D12.776.543.585.400.750.900.124.500 – shab potassium channels
- MeSH D12.776.543.585.400.750.900.249 – ether-a-go-go potassium channels
- MeSH D12.776.543.585.400.750.900.624 – shaker superfamily of potassium channels
- MeSH D12.776.543.585.400.750.900.624.124 – kv1.1 potassium channel
- MeSH D12.776.543.585.400.750.900.624.186 – kv1.2 potassium channel
- MeSH D12.776.543.585.400.750.900.624.217 – kv1.3 potassium channel
- MeSH D12.776.543.585.400.750.900.624.233 – kv1.4 potassium channel
- MeSH D12.776.543.585.400.750.900.624.241 – kv1.5 potassium channel
- MeSH D12.776.543.585.400.750.900.624.245 – kv1.6 potassium channel
- MeSH D12.776.543.585.400.750.900.624.249 – shab potassium channels
- MeSH D12.776.543.585.400.750.900.624.625 – shal potassium channels
- MeSH D12.776.543.585.400.750.900.624.750 – shaw potassium channels
- MeSH D12.776.543.585.400.875 – sodium channels
- MeSH D12.776.543.585.400.901 – transient receptor potential channels
- MeSH D12.776.543.585.400.901.500 – trpc cation channels
- MeSH D12.776.543.585.400.901.555 – trpm cation channels
- MeSH D12.776.543.585.400.901.777 – trpp cation channels

==== MeSH D12.776.543.585.450 – ion pumps ====
===== MeSH D12.776.543.585.450.074 – anion transport proteins =====
- MeSH D12.776.543.585.450.074.249 – halorhodopsins
- MeSH D12.776.543.585.450.074.500 – organic anion transporters
- MeSH D12.776.543.585.450.074.500.149 – dicarboxylic acid transporters
- MeSH D12.776.543.585.450.074.500.300 – monocarboxylic acid transporters
- MeSH D12.776.543.585.450.074.500.500 – organic anion transporters, atp-dependent
- MeSH D12.776.543.585.450.074.500.500.500 – multidrug resistance-associated proteins
- MeSH D12.776.543.585.450.074.500.500.750 – p-glycoprotein
- MeSH D12.776.543.585.450.074.500.500.875 – p-glycoproteins
- MeSH D12.776.543.585.450.074.500.812 – organic anion transporters, sodium-dependent
- MeSH D12.776.543.585.450.074.500.875 – organic anion transporters, sodium-independent
- MeSH D12.776.543.585.450.074.500.875.500 – organic anion transport polypeptide c
- MeSH D12.776.543.585.450.074.500.875.750 – organic anion transport protein 1
- MeSH D12.776.543.585.450.074.750 – phosphate transport proteins
- MeSH D12.776.543.585.450.074.750.500 – proton-phosphate symporters
- MeSH D12.776.543.585.450.074.750.750 – sodium-phosphate cotransporter proteins
- MeSH D12.776.543.585.450.074.750.750.500 – sodium-phosphate cotransporter proteins, type i
- MeSH D12.776.543.585.450.074.750.750.750 – sodium-phosphate cotransporter proteins, type ii
- MeSH D12.776.543.585.450.074.750.750.750.124 – sodium-phosphate cotransporter proteins, type iia
- MeSH D12.776.543.585.450.074.750.750.750.249 – sodium-phosphate cotransporter proteins, type iib
- MeSH D12.776.543.585.450.074.750.750.750.500 – sodium-phosphate cotransporter proteins, type iic
- MeSH D12.776.543.585.450.074.750.750.875 – sodium-phosphate cotransporter proteins, type iii

===== MeSH D12.776.543.585.450.162 – antiporters =====
- MeSH D12.776.543.585.450.162.110 – anion exchange protein 1, erythrocyte
- MeSH D12.776.543.585.450.162.193 – chloride-bicarbonate antiporters
- MeSH D12.776.543.585.450.162.193.500 – anion exchange protein 1, erythrocyte
- MeSH D12.776.543.585.450.162.234 – organic anion transport protein 1
- MeSH D12.776.543.585.450.162.235 – mitochondrial adp, atp translocases
- MeSH D12.776.543.585.450.162.235.100 – adenine nucleotide translocator 1
- MeSH D12.776.543.585.450.162.235.200 – adenine nucleotide translocator 2
- MeSH D12.776.543.585.450.162.235.300 – adenine nucleotide translocator 3
- MeSH D12.776.543.585.450.162.276 – potassium-hydrogen antiporters
- MeSH D12.776.543.585.450.162.442 – sodium-calcium exchanger
- MeSH D12.776.543.585.450.162.775 – sodium-hydrogen antiporter
- MeSH D12.776.543.585.450.162.887 – vesicular neurotransmitter transport proteins
- MeSH D12.776.543.585.450.162.887.500 – vesicular biogenic amine transport proteins
- MeSH D12.776.543.585.450.162.887.500.249 – vesicular acetylcholine transport proteins
- MeSH D12.776.543.585.450.162.887.500.500 – vesicular monoamine transport proteins
- MeSH D12.776.543.585.450.162.887.625 – vesicular glutamate transport proteins
- MeSH D12.776.543.585.450.162.887.625.500 – vesicular glutamate transport protein 1
- MeSH D12.776.543.585.450.162.887.625.750 – vesicular glutamate transport protein 2
- MeSH D12.776.543.585.450.162.887.750 – vesicular inhibitory amino acid transport proteins

===== MeSH D12.776.543.585.450.250 – cation transport proteins =====
- MeSH D12.776.543.585.450.250.500 – ca(2+)-transporting atpase
- MeSH D12.776.543.585.450.250.750 – na(+)-k(+)-exchanging atpase
- MeSH D12.776.543.585.450.250.812 – organic cation transport proteins
- MeSH D12.776.543.585.450.250.812.500 – organic cation transporter 1
- MeSH D12.776.543.585.450.250.875 – proton pumps
- MeSH D12.776.543.585.450.250.875.249 – bacteriorhodopsins
- MeSH D12.776.543.585.450.250.875.311 – cytochrome b6f complex
- MeSH D12.776.543.585.450.250.875.311.500 – cytochromes b6
- MeSH D12.776.543.585.450.250.875.311.750 – cytochromes f
- MeSH D12.776.543.585.450.250.875.311.875 – plastoquinol-plastocyanin reductase
- MeSH D12.776.543.585.450.250.875.374 – inorganic pyrophosphatase
- MeSH D12.776.543.585.450.250.875.437 – electron transport complex i
- MeSH D12.776.543.585.450.250.875.468 – electron transport complex iii
- MeSH D12.776.543.585.450.250.875.484 – electron transport complex iv
- MeSH D12.776.543.585.450.250.875.492 – photosystem i protein complex
- MeSH D12.776.543.585.450.250.875.500 – proton-translocating atpases
- MeSH D12.776.543.585.450.250.875.500.249 – bacterial proton-translocating atpases
- MeSH D12.776.543.585.450.250.875.500.500 – chloroplast proton-translocating atpases
- MeSH D12.776.543.585.450.250.875.500.625 – h(+)-k(+)-exchanging atpase
- MeSH D12.776.543.585.450.250.875.500.750 – mitochondrial proton-translocating atpases
- MeSH D12.776.543.585.450.250.875.500.875 – vacuolar proton-translocating atpases

===== MeSH D12.776.543.585.450.625 – symporters =====
- MeSH D12.776.543.585.450.625.124 – dopamine plasma membrane transport proteins
- MeSH D12.776.543.585.450.625.139 – gaba plasma membrane transport proteins
- MeSH D12.776.543.585.450.625.147 – glutamate plasma membrane transport proteins
- MeSH D12.776.543.585.450.625.147.500 – excitatory amino acid transporter 1
- MeSH D12.776.543.585.450.625.147.750 – excitatory amino acid transporter 2
- MeSH D12.776.543.585.450.625.147.875 – excitatory amino acid transporter 3
- MeSH D12.776.543.585.450.625.147.937 – excitatory amino acid transporter 4
- MeSH D12.776.543.585.450.625.147.968 – excitatory amino acid transporter 5
- MeSH D12.776.543.585.450.625.155 – glycine plasma membrane transport proteins
- MeSH D12.776.543.585.450.625.186 – norepinephrine plasma membrane transport proteins
- MeSH D12.776.543.585.450.625.249 – proton-phosphate symporters
- MeSH D12.776.543.585.450.625.374 – serotonin plasma membrane transport proteins
- MeSH D12.776.543.585.450.625.500 – sodium-bicarbonate symporters
- MeSH D12.776.543.585.450.625.562 – sodium-glucose transport proteins
- MeSH D12.776.543.585.450.625.562.500 – sodium-glucose transporter 1
- MeSH D12.776.543.585.450.625.562.750 – sodium-glucose transporter 2
- MeSH D12.776.543.585.450.625.625 – sodium-phosphate cotransporter proteins
- MeSH D12.776.543.585.450.625.625.500 – sodium-phosphate cotransporter proteins, type i
- MeSH D12.776.543.585.450.625.625.750 – sodium-phosphate cotransporter proteins, type ii
- MeSH D12.776.543.585.450.625.625.750.124 – sodium-phosphate cotransporter proteins, type iia
- MeSH D12.776.543.585.450.625.625.750.249 – sodium-phosphate cotransporter proteins, type iib
- MeSH D12.776.543.585.450.625.625.750.500 – sodium-phosphate cotransporter proteins, type iic
- MeSH D12.776.543.585.450.625.625.875 – sodium-phosphate cotransporter proteins, type iii
- MeSH D12.776.543.585.450.625.750 – sodium-potassium-chloride symporters

==== MeSH D12.776.543.585.500 – monosaccharide transport proteins ====
- MeSH D12.776.543.585.500.500 – glucose transport proteins, facilitative
- MeSH D12.776.543.585.500.500.500 – glucose transporter type 1
- MeSH D12.776.543.585.500.500.750 – glucose transporter type 2
- MeSH D12.776.543.585.500.500.875 – glucose transporter type 3
- MeSH D12.776.543.585.500.500.937 – glucose transporter type 4
- MeSH D12.776.543.585.500.500.968 – glucose transporter type 5
- MeSH D12.776.543.585.500.750 – sodium-glucose transport proteins
- MeSH D12.776.543.585.500.750.500 – sodium-glucose transporter 1
- MeSH D12.776.543.585.500.750.750 – sodium-glucose transporter 2

==== MeSH D12.776.543.585.562 – neurotransmitter transport proteins ====
- MeSH D12.776.543.585.562.374 – plasma membrane neurotransmitter transport proteins
- MeSH D12.776.543.585.562.374.500 – catecholamine plasma membrane transport proteins
- MeSH D12.776.543.585.562.374.500.500 – dopamine plasma membrane transport proteins
- MeSH D12.776.543.585.562.374.500.750 – norepinephrine plasma membrane transport proteins
- MeSH D12.776.543.585.562.374.750 – gaba plasma membrane transport proteins
- MeSH D12.776.543.585.562.374.781 – glutamate plasma membrane transport proteins
- MeSH D12.776.543.585.562.374.781.500 – excitatory amino acid transporter 1
- MeSH D12.776.543.585.562.374.781.750 – excitatory amino acid transporter 2
- MeSH D12.776.543.585.562.374.781.781 – excitatory amino acid transporter 3
- MeSH D12.776.543.585.562.374.781.812 – excitatory amino acid transporter 4
- MeSH D12.776.543.585.562.374.781.875 – excitatory amino acid transporter 5
- MeSH D12.776.543.585.562.374.812 – glycine plasma membrane transport proteins
- MeSH D12.776.543.585.562.374.875 – serotonin plasma membrane transport proteins
- MeSH D12.776.543.585.562.750 – vesicular neurotransmitter transport proteins
- MeSH D12.776.543.585.562.750.500 – vesicular biogenic amine transport proteins
- MeSH D12.776.543.585.562.750.500.249 – vesicular acetylcholine transport proteins
- MeSH D12.776.543.585.562.750.500.500 – vesicular monoamine transport proteins
- MeSH D12.776.543.585.562.750.625 – vesicular glutamate transport proteins
- MeSH D12.776.543.585.562.750.625.500 – vesicular glutamate transport protein 1
- MeSH D12.776.543.585.562.750.625.750 – vesicular glutamate transport protein 2
- MeSH D12.776.543.585.562.750.750 – vesicular inhibitory amino acid transport proteins

==== MeSH D12.776.543.585.625 – nucleobase, nucleoside, nucleotide, and nucleic acid transport proteins ====
- MeSH D12.776.543.585.625.500 – nucleobase transport proteins
- MeSH D12.776.543.585.625.750 – nucleoside transport proteins
- MeSH D12.776.543.585.625.750.500 – equilibrative nucleoside transport proteins
- MeSH D12.776.543.585.625.750.500.500 – equilibrative nucleoside transporter 1
- MeSH D12.776.543.585.625.750.500.750 – equilibrative-nucleoside transporter 2
- MeSH D12.776.543.585.625.875 – nucleotide transport proteins
- MeSH D12.776.543.585.625.875.500 – mitochondrial adp, atp translocases
- MeSH D12.776.543.585.625.875.500.100 – adenine nucleotide translocator 1
- MeSH D12.776.543.585.625.875.500.200 – adenine nucleotide translocator 2
- MeSH D12.776.543.585.625.875.500.300 – adenine nucleotide translocator 3

==== MeSH D12.776.543.585.750 – nucleocytoplasmic transport proteins ====
- MeSH D12.776.543.585.750.100 – aryl hydrocarbon receptor nuclear translocator
- MeSH D12.776.543.585.750.200 – cellular apoptosis susceptibility protein
- MeSH D12.776.543.585.750.500 – karyopherins
- MeSH D12.776.543.585.750.500.100 – alpha karyopherins
- MeSH D12.776.543.585.750.500.249 – beta karyopherins
- MeSH D12.776.543.585.750.625 – nuclear pore complex proteins
- MeSH D12.776.543.585.750.750 – ran gtp-binding protein

=== MeSH D12.776.543.620 – myelin proteins ===
==== MeSH D12.776.543.620.540 – myelin basic proteins ====
- MeSH D12.776.543.620.540.540 – myelin p2 protein

=== MeSH D12.776.543.750 – receptors, cell surface ===
==== MeSH D12.776.543.750.055 – neuropilins ====
- MeSH D12.776.543.750.055.500 – neuropilin-1
- MeSH D12.776.543.750.055.750 – neuropilin-2

==== MeSH D12.776.543.750.060 – receptor protein-tyrosine kinases ====
- MeSH D12.776.543.750.060.020 – fms-like tyrosine kinase 3
- MeSH D12.776.543.750.060.061 – receptor, fibroblast growth factor, type 1
- MeSH D12.776.543.750.060.092 – receptor, fibroblast growth factor, type 2
- MeSH D12.776.543.750.060.108 – receptor, fibroblast growth factor, type 3
- MeSH D12.776.543.750.060.116 – receptor, fibroblast growth factor, type 4
- MeSH D12.776.543.750.060.124 – proto-oncogene proteins c-kit
- MeSH D12.776.543.750.060.186 – proto-oncogene proteins c-met
- MeSH D12.776.543.750.060.217 – proto-oncogene proteins c-ret
- MeSH D12.776.543.750.060.249 – receptor, epidermal growth factor
- MeSH D12.776.543.750.060.374 – receptor, erbb-2
- MeSH D12.776.543.750.060.437 – receptor, erbb-3
- MeSH D12.776.543.750.060.468 – receptor, igf type 1
- MeSH D12.776.543.750.060.484 – receptor, insulin
- MeSH D12.776.543.750.060.492 – receptor, macrophage colony-stimulating factor
- MeSH D12.776.543.750.060.496 – receptor, trka
- MeSH D12.776.543.750.060.498 – receptor, trkb
- MeSH D12.776.543.750.060.499 – receptor, trkc
- MeSH D12.776.543.750.060.500 – receptors, eph family
- MeSH D12.776.543.750.060.500.050 – receptor, epha1
- MeSH D12.776.543.750.060.500.100 – receptor, epha2
- MeSH D12.776.543.750.060.500.150 – receptor, epha3
- MeSH D12.776.543.750.060.500.200 – receptor, epha4
- MeSH D12.776.543.750.060.500.250 – receptor, epha5
- MeSH D12.776.543.750.060.500.300 – receptor, epha6
- MeSH D12.776.543.750.060.500.350 – receptor, epha7
- MeSH D12.776.543.750.060.500.400 – receptor, epha8
- MeSH D12.776.543.750.060.500.450 – receptor, ephb1
- MeSH D12.776.543.750.060.500.500 – receptor, ephb2
- MeSH D12.776.543.750.060.500.687 – receptor, ephb3
- MeSH D12.776.543.750.060.500.781 – receptor, ephb4
- MeSH D12.776.543.750.060.500.875 – receptor, ephb5
- MeSH D12.776.543.750.060.500.937 – receptor, ephb6
- MeSH D12.776.543.750.060.625 – receptors, platelet-derived growth factor
- MeSH D12.776.543.750.060.625.300 – receptor, platelet-derived growth factor alpha
- MeSH D12.776.543.750.060.625.400 – receptor, platelet-derived growth factor beta
- MeSH D12.776.543.750.060.687 – receptors, tie
- MeSH D12.776.543.750.060.687.249 – receptor, tie-1
- MeSH D12.776.543.750.060.687.500 – receptor, tie-2
- MeSH D12.776.543.750.060.750 – receptors, vascular endothelial growth factor
- MeSH D12.776.543.750.060.750.100 – vascular endothelial growth factor receptor-1
- MeSH D12.776.543.750.060.750.200 – vascular endothelial growth factor receptor 2
- MeSH D12.776.543.750.060.750.300 – vascular endothelial growth factor receptor-3

==== MeSH D12.776.543.750.070 – receptors, biogenic amine ====
- MeSH D12.776.543.750.070.300 – receptors, catecholamine
- MeSH D12.776.543.750.070.300.300 – receptors, adrenergic
- MeSH D12.776.543.750.070.300.300.300 – receptors, adrenergic, alpha
- MeSH D12.776.543.750.070.300.300.300.700 – receptors, adrenergic, alpha-1
- MeSH D12.776.543.750.070.300.300.300.725 – receptors, adrenergic, alpha-2
- MeSH D12.776.543.750.070.300.300.340 – receptors, adrenergic, beta
- MeSH D12.776.543.750.070.300.300.340.700 – receptors, adrenergic, beta-1
- MeSH D12.776.543.750.070.300.300.340.725 – receptors, adrenergic, beta-2
- MeSH D12.776.543.750.070.300.300.340.900 – receptors, adrenergic, beta-3
- MeSH D12.776.543.750.070.300.400 – receptors, dopamine
- MeSH D12.776.543.750.070.300.400.400 – receptors, dopamine d1
- MeSH D12.776.543.750.070.300.400.400.500 – receptors, dopamine d5
- MeSH D12.776.543.750.070.300.400.500 – receptors, dopamine d2
- MeSH D12.776.543.750.070.300.400.500.249 – receptors, dopamine d3
- MeSH D12.776.543.750.070.300.400.500.500 – receptors, dopamine d4
- MeSH D12.776.543.750.070.450 – receptors, histamine
- MeSH D12.776.543.750.070.450.100 – receptors, histamine h1
- MeSH D12.776.543.750.070.450.400 – receptors, histamine h2
- MeSH D12.776.543.750.070.450.500 – receptors, histamine h3
- MeSH D12.776.543.750.070.800 – receptors, serotonin
- MeSH D12.776.543.750.070.800.100 – receptors, serotonin, 5-ht1
- MeSH D12.776.543.750.070.800.100.100 – receptor, serotonin, 5-ht1a
- MeSH D12.776.543.750.070.800.100.150 – receptor, serotonin, 5-ht1b
- MeSH D12.776.543.750.070.800.100.200 – receptor, serotonin, 5-ht1d
- MeSH D12.776.543.750.070.800.200 – receptors, serotonin, 5-ht2
- MeSH D12.776.543.750.070.800.200.100 – receptor, serotonin, 5-ht2a
- MeSH D12.776.543.750.070.800.200.150 – receptor, serotonin, 5-ht2b
- MeSH D12.776.543.750.070.800.200.575 – receptor, serotonin, 5-ht2c
- MeSH D12.776.543.750.070.800.300 – receptors, serotonin, 5-ht3
- MeSH D12.776.543.750.070.800.400 – receptors, serotonin, 5-ht4

==== MeSH D12.776.543.750.072 – receptors, collagen ====
- MeSH D12.776.543.750.072.100 – integrin alpha1beta1
- MeSH D12.776.543.750.072.200 – integrin alpha2beta1
- MeSH D12.776.543.750.072.300 – integrin alpha3beta1

==== MeSH D12.776.543.750.075 – receptors, eicosanoid ====
- MeSH D12.776.543.750.075.450 – receptors, leukotriene
- MeSH D12.776.543.750.075.450.300 – receptors, leukotriene b4
- MeSH D12.776.543.750.075.575 – receptors, lipoxin
- MeSH D12.776.543.750.075.700 – receptors, prostaglandin
- MeSH D12.776.543.750.075.700.299 – receptors, epoprostenol
- MeSH D12.776.543.750.075.700.600 – receptors, prostaglandin e
- MeSH D12.776.543.750.075.700.800 – receptors, thromboxane a2, prostaglandin h2
- MeSH D12.776.543.750.075.800 – receptors, thromboxane
- MeSH D12.776.543.750.075.800.500 – receptors, thromboxane a2, prostaglandin h2

==== MeSH D12.776.543.750.100 – receptors, g-protein-coupled ====
===== MeSH D12.776.543.750.100.047 – receptors, angiotensin =====
- MeSH D12.776.543.750.100.047.625 – receptor, angiotensin, type 1
- MeSH D12.776.543.750.100.047.687 – receptor, angiotensin, type 2

===== MeSH D12.776.543.750.100.080 – receptors, bradykinin =====
- MeSH D12.776.543.750.100.080.249 – receptor, bradykinin b1
- MeSH D12.776.543.750.100.080.500 – receptor, bradykinin b2

===== MeSH D12.776.543.750.100.125 – receptors, cannabinoid =====
- MeSH D12.776.543.750.100.125.100 – receptor, cannabinoid, cb1
- MeSH D12.776.543.750.100.125.200 – receptor, cannabinoid, cb2

===== MeSH D12.776.543.750.100.150 – receptors, catecholamine =====
- MeSH D12.776.543.750.100.150.300 – receptors, adrenergic
- MeSH D12.776.543.750.100.150.300.300 – receptors, adrenergic, alpha
- MeSH D12.776.543.750.100.150.300.300.700 – receptors, adrenergic, alpha-1
- MeSH D12.776.543.750.100.150.300.300.725 – receptors, adrenergic, alpha-2
- MeSH D12.776.543.750.100.150.300.340 – receptors, adrenergic, beta
- MeSH D12.776.543.750.100.150.300.340.700 – receptors, adrenergic, beta-1
- MeSH D12.776.543.750.100.150.300.340.725 – receptors, adrenergic, beta-2
- MeSH D12.776.543.750.100.150.300.340.900 – receptors, adrenergic, beta-3
- MeSH D12.776.543.750.100.150.400 – receptors, dopamine
- MeSH D12.776.543.750.100.150.400.400 – receptors, dopamine d1
- MeSH D12.776.543.750.100.150.400.400.500 – receptors, dopamine d5
- MeSH D12.776.543.750.100.150.400.500 – receptors, dopamine d2
- MeSH D12.776.543.750.100.150.400.500.500 – receptors, dopamine d3
- MeSH D12.776.543.750.100.150.400.500.750 – receptors, dopamine d4

===== MeSH D12.776.543.750.100.160 – receptors, chemokine =====
- MeSH D12.776.543.750.100.160.605 – receptors, ccr5
- MeSH D12.776.543.750.100.160.650 – receptors, cxcr4
- MeSH D12.776.543.750.100.160.825 – receptors, interleukin-8a

===== MeSH D12.776.543.750.100.170 – receptors, cholecystokinin =====
- MeSH D12.776.543.750.100.170.100 – receptor, cholecystokinin a
- MeSH D12.776.543.750.100.170.200 – receptor, cholecystokinin b

===== MeSH D12.776.543.750.100.200 – receptors, eicosanoid =====
- MeSH D12.776.543.750.100.200.450 – receptors, leukotriene
- MeSH D12.776.543.750.100.200.450.300 – receptors, leukotriene b4
- MeSH D12.776.543.750.100.200.700 – receptors, prostaglandin
- MeSH D12.776.543.750.100.200.700.299 – receptors, epoprostenol
- MeSH D12.776.543.750.100.200.700.600 – receptors, prostaglandin e
- MeSH D12.776.543.750.100.200.700.800 – receptors, thromboxane a2, prostaglandin h2
- MeSH D12.776.543.750.100.200.800 – receptors, thromboxane
- MeSH D12.776.543.750.100.200.800.500 – receptors, thromboxane a2, prostaglandin h2

===== MeSH D12.776.543.750.100.220 – receptors, endothelin =====
- MeSH D12.776.543.750.100.220.100 – receptor, endothelin a
- MeSH D12.776.543.750.100.220.200 – receptor, endothelin b

===== MeSH D12.776.543.750.100.315 – receptors, galanin =====
- MeSH D12.776.543.750.100.315.100 – receptor, galanin, type 1
- MeSH D12.776.543.750.100.315.200 – receptor, galanin, type 2
- MeSH D12.776.543.750.100.315.300 – receptor, galanin, type 3

===== MeSH D12.776.543.750.100.420 – receptors, lysophospholipid =====
- MeSH D12.776.543.750.100.420.249 – receptors, lysophosphatidic acid
- MeSH D12.776.543.750.100.420.500 – receptors, lysosphingolipid

===== MeSH D12.776.543.750.100.430 – receptors, melanocortin =====
- MeSH D12.776.543.750.100.430.500 – receptor, melanocortin, type 1
- MeSH D12.776.543.750.100.430.750 – receptor, melanocortin, type 2
- MeSH D12.776.543.750.100.430.875 – receptor, melanocortin, type 3
- MeSH D12.776.543.750.100.430.937 – receptor, melanocortin, type 4

===== MeSH D12.776.543.750.100.440 – receptors, melatonin =====
- MeSH D12.776.543.750.100.440.500 – receptor, melatonin, mt1
- MeSH D12.776.543.750.100.440.750 – receptor, melatonin, mt2

===== MeSH D12.776.543.750.100.475 – receptors, muscarinic =====
- MeSH D12.776.543.750.100.475.100 – receptor, muscarinic m1
- MeSH D12.776.543.750.100.475.200 – receptor, muscarinic m2
- MeSH D12.776.543.750.100.475.300 – receptor, muscarinic m3
- MeSH D12.776.543.750.100.475.400 – receptor, muscarinic m4
- MeSH D12.776.543.750.100.475.500 – receptor, muscarinic m5

===== MeSH D12.776.543.750.100.620 – receptors, opioid =====
- MeSH D12.776.543.750.100.620.200 – receptors, opioid, delta
- MeSH D12.776.543.750.100.620.400 – receptors, opioid, kappa
- MeSH D12.776.543.750.100.620.550 – receptors, opioid, mu
- MeSH D12.776.543.750.100.620.775 – receptors, sigma

===== MeSH D12.776.543.750.100.650 – receptors, parathyroid hormone =====
- MeSH D12.776.543.750.100.650.100 – receptor, parathyroid hormone, type 1
- MeSH D12.776.543.750.100.650.200 – receptor, parathyroid hormone, type 2

===== MeSH D12.776.543.750.100.660 – receptors, pheromone =====
- MeSH D12.776.543.750.100.660.500 – receptors, mating factor

===== MeSH D12.776.543.750.100.665 – receptors, pituitary adenylate cyclase-activating polypeptide =====
- MeSH D12.776.543.750.100.665.500 – receptors, pituitary adenylate cyclase-activating polypeptide, type i
- MeSH D12.776.543.750.100.665.750 – receptors, vasoactive intestinal peptide, type ii
- MeSH D12.776.543.750.100.665.760 – receptors, vasoactive intestinal polypeptide, type i

===== MeSH D12.776.543.750.100.700 – receptors, purinergic =====
- MeSH D12.776.543.750.100.700.150 – receptors, cyclic amp
- MeSH D12.776.543.750.100.700.700 – receptors, purinergic p1
- MeSH D12.776.543.750.100.700.700.100 – receptor, adenosine a1
- MeSH D12.776.543.750.100.700.700.200 – receptors, adenosine a2
- MeSH D12.776.543.750.100.700.700.200.100 – receptor, adenosine a2a
- MeSH D12.776.543.750.100.700.700.200.200 – receptor, adenosine a2b
- MeSH D12.776.543.750.100.700.700.300 – receptor, adenosine a3
- MeSH D12.776.543.750.100.700.720 – receptors, purinergic p2

===== MeSH D12.776.543.750.100.800 – receptors, serotonin =====
- MeSH D12.776.543.750.100.800.100 – receptors, serotonin, 5-ht1
- MeSH D12.776.543.750.100.800.100.100 – receptor, serotonin, 5-ht1a
- MeSH D12.776.543.750.100.800.100.150 – receptor, serotonin, 5-ht1b
- MeSH D12.776.543.750.100.800.100.200 – receptor, serotonin, 5-ht1d
- MeSH D12.776.543.750.100.800.200 – receptors, serotonin, 5-ht2
- MeSH D12.776.543.750.100.800.200.100 – receptor, serotonin, 5-ht2a
- MeSH D12.776.543.750.100.800.200.150 – receptor, serotonin, 5-ht2b
- MeSH D12.776.543.750.100.800.200.200 – receptor, serotonin, 5-ht2c
- MeSH D12.776.543.750.100.800.400 – receptors, serotonin, 5-ht4

===== MeSH D12.776.543.750.100.875 – receptors, thrombin =====
- MeSH D12.776.543.750.100.875.500 – receptor, par-1

===== MeSH D12.776.543.750.100.900 – receptors, vasoactive intestinal peptide =====
- MeSH D12.776.543.750.100.900.500 – receptors, vasoactive intestinal peptide, type ii
- MeSH D12.776.543.750.100.900.520 – receptors, vasoactive intestinal polypeptide, type i

==== MeSH D12.776.543.750.120 – receptors, guanylate cyclase-coupled ====
- MeSH D12.776.543.750.120.500 – receptors, atrial natriuretic factor

==== MeSH D12.776.543.750.705 – receptors, immunologic ====
===== MeSH D12.776.543.750.705.400 – immunophilins =====
- MeSH D12.776.543.750.705.400.300 – cyclophilins
- MeSH D12.776.543.750.705.400.700 – tacrolimus binding proteins
- MeSH D12.776.543.750.705.400.700.500 – tacrolimus binding protein 1a

===== MeSH D12.776.543.750.705.408 – integrins =====
- MeSH D12.776.543.750.705.408.100 – integrin alpha chains
- MeSH D12.776.543.750.705.408.100.100 – antigens, cd11a
- MeSH D12.776.543.750.705.408.100.150 – antigens, cd11b
- MeSH D12.776.543.750.705.408.100.200 – antigens, cd11c
- MeSH D12.776.543.750.705.408.100.300 – integrin alpha1
- MeSH D12.776.543.750.705.408.100.350 – integrin alpha2
- MeSH D12.776.543.750.705.408.100.400 – integrin alpha3
- MeSH D12.776.543.750.705.408.100.450 – integrin alpha4
- MeSH D12.776.543.750.705.408.100.500 – integrin alpha5
- MeSH D12.776.543.750.705.408.100.550 – integrin alpha6
- MeSH D12.776.543.750.705.408.100.900 – integrin alphav
- MeSH D12.776.543.750.705.408.100.950 – platelet membrane glycoprotein iib
- MeSH D12.776.543.750.705.408.200 – integrin beta chains
- MeSH D12.776.543.750.705.408.200.249 – antigens, cd18
- MeSH D12.776.543.750.705.408.200.500 – antigens, cd29
- MeSH D12.776.543.750.705.408.200.750 – integrin beta3
- MeSH D12.776.543.750.705.408.200.800 – integrin beta4
- MeSH D12.776.543.750.705.408.460 – receptors, cytoadhesin
- MeSH D12.776.543.750.705.408.460.170 – integrin alpha6beta4
- MeSH D12.776.543.750.705.408.460.700 – platelet glycoprotein gpiib-iiia complex
- MeSH D12.776.543.750.705.408.460.870 – receptors, vitronectin
- MeSH D12.776.543.750.705.408.460.870.500 – integrin alphavbeta3
- MeSH D12.776.543.750.705.408.495 – receptors, fibrinogen
- MeSH D12.776.543.750.705.408.495.500 – macrophage-1 antigen
- MeSH D12.776.543.750.705.408.530 – receptors, fibronectin
- MeSH D12.776.543.750.705.408.530.249 – integrin alpha2beta1
- MeSH D12.776.543.750.705.408.530.500 – integrin alpha4beta1
- MeSH D12.776.543.750.705.408.530.750 – integrin alpha5beta1
- MeSH D12.776.543.750.705.408.600 – receptors, leukocyte-adhesion
- MeSH D12.776.543.750.705.408.600.100 – integrin alphaxbeta2
- MeSH D12.776.543.750.705.408.600.400 – lymphocyte function-associated antigen-1
- MeSH D12.776.543.750.705.408.600.500 – macrophage-1 antigen
- MeSH D12.776.543.750.705.408.850 – receptors, very late antigen
- MeSH D12.776.543.750.705.408.850.099 – integrin alpha1beta1
- MeSH D12.776.543.750.705.408.850.199 – integrin alpha2beta1
- MeSH D12.776.543.750.705.408.850.249 – integrin alpha3beta1
- MeSH D12.776.543.750.705.408.850.299 – integrin alpha4beta1
- MeSH D12.776.543.750.705.408.850.349 – integrin alpha5beta1
- MeSH D12.776.543.750.705.408.850.674 – integrin alpha6beta1
- MeSH D12.776.543.750.705.408.925 – receptors, vitronectin

===== MeSH D12.776.543.750.705.675 – platelet membrane glycoproteins =====
- MeSH D12.776.543.750.705.675.136 – antigens, cd36
- MeSH D12.776.543.750.705.675.352 – integrin alpha2beta1
- MeSH D12.776.543.750.705.675.460 – integrin alpha5beta1
- MeSH D12.776.543.750.705.675.514 – integrin alpha6beta1
- MeSH D12.776.543.750.705.675.541 – integrin alphavbeta3
- MeSH D12.776.543.750.705.675.554 – lysosomal-associated membrane protein 1
- MeSH D12.776.543.750.705.675.568 – platelet glycoprotein gpib-ix complex
- MeSH D12.776.543.750.705.675.784 – platelet glycoprotein gpiib-iiia complex

===== MeSH D12.776.543.750.705.816 – receptors, antigen =====
- MeSH D12.776.543.750.705.816.821 – receptors, antigen, b-cell
- MeSH D12.776.543.750.705.816.821.500 – antigens, cd79
- MeSH D12.776.543.750.705.816.824 – receptors, antigen, t-cell
- MeSH D12.776.543.750.705.816.824.133 – antigens, cd28
- MeSH D12.776.543.750.705.816.824.300 – complementarity determining regions
- MeSH D12.776.543.750.705.816.824.800 – receptor-cd3 complex, antigen, t-cell
- MeSH D12.776.543.750.705.816.824.825 – receptors, antigen, t-cell, alpha-beta
- MeSH D12.776.543.750.705.816.824.830 – receptors, antigen, t-cell, gamma-delta

===== MeSH D12.776.543.750.705.833 – receptors, complement =====
- MeSH D12.776.543.750.705.833.124 – antigens, cd46
- MeSH D12.776.543.750.705.833.249 – integrin alphaxbeta2
- MeSH D12.776.543.750.705.833.500 – macrophage-1 antigen
- MeSH D12.776.543.750.705.833.550 – receptor, anaphylatoxin c5a
- MeSH D12.776.543.750.705.833.600 – receptors, complement 3b
- MeSH D12.776.543.750.705.833.610 – receptors, complement 3d

===== MeSH D12.776.543.750.705.852 – receptors, cytokine =====
- MeSH D12.776.543.750.705.852.062 – cytokine receptor gp130
- MeSH D12.776.543.750.705.852.125 – receptors, chemokine
- MeSH D12.776.543.750.705.852.125.605 – receptors, ccr5
- MeSH D12.776.543.750.705.852.125.650 – receptors, cxcr4
- MeSH D12.776.543.750.705.852.125.825 – receptors, interleukin-8a
- MeSH D12.776.543.750.705.852.150 – receptors, colony-stimulating factor
- MeSH D12.776.543.750.705.852.150.100 – proto-oncogene proteins c-kit
- MeSH D12.776.543.750.705.852.150.150 – receptor, macrophage colony-stimulating factor
- MeSH D12.776.543.750.705.852.150.200 – receptors, erythropoietin
- MeSH D12.776.543.750.705.852.150.280 – receptors, granulocyte colony-stimulating factor
- MeSH D12.776.543.750.705.852.150.310 – receptors, granulocyte-macrophage colony-stimulating factor
- MeSH D12.776.543.750.705.852.150.360 – receptors, interleukin-3
- MeSH D12.776.543.750.705.852.400 – receptors, interferon
- MeSH D12.776.543.750.705.852.420 – receptors, interleukin
- MeSH D12.776.543.750.705.852.420.300 – receptors, interleukin-1
- MeSH D12.776.543.750.705.852.420.320 – receptors, interleukin-2
- MeSH D12.776.543.750.705.852.420.340 – receptors, interleukin-3
- MeSH D12.776.543.750.705.852.420.360 – receptors, interleukin-4
- MeSH D12.776.543.750.705.852.420.400 – receptors, interleukin-6
- MeSH D12.776.543.750.705.852.420.420 – receptors, interleukin-7
- MeSH D12.776.543.750.705.852.420.423 – receptors, interleukin-8a
- MeSH D12.776.543.750.705.852.420.426 – receptors, interleukin-8b
- MeSH D12.776.543.750.705.852.720 – receptors, transforming growth factor beta
- MeSH D12.776.543.750.705.852.760 – receptors, tumor necrosis factor
- MeSH D12.776.543.750.705.852.760.048 – antigens, cd27
- MeSH D12.776.543.750.705.852.760.072 – antigens, cd30
- MeSH D12.776.543.750.705.852.760.097 – antigens, cd40
- MeSH D12.776.543.750.705.852.760.195 – antigens, cd95
- MeSH D12.776.543.750.705.852.760.597 – receptors, tumor necrosis factor, type i
- MeSH D12.776.543.750.705.852.760.798 – receptors, tumor necrosis factor, type ii

===== MeSH D12.776.543.750.705.871 – receptors, fc =====
- MeSH D12.776.543.750.705.871.280 – receptors, ige
- MeSH D12.776.543.750.705.871.300 – receptors, igg
- MeSH D12.776.543.750.705.871.700 – receptors, polymeric immunoglobulin

===== MeSH D12.776.543.750.705.876 – receptors, laminin =====
- MeSH D12.776.543.750.705.876.249 – integrin alpha1beta1
- MeSH D12.776.543.750.705.876.280 – integrin alpha2beta1
- MeSH D12.776.543.750.705.876.311 – integrin alpha3beta1
- MeSH D12.776.543.750.705.876.374 – integrin alpha5beta1
- MeSH D12.776.543.750.705.876.500 – integrin alpha6beta1
- MeSH D12.776.543.750.705.876.750 – integrin alpha6beta4

===== MeSH D12.776.543.750.705.877 – receptors, lymphocyte homing =====
- MeSH D12.776.543.750.705.877.144 – antigens, cd44
- MeSH D12.776.543.750.705.877.347 – integrin alpha4beta1
- MeSH D12.776.543.750.705.877.550 – lymphocyte function-associated antigen-1
- MeSH D12.776.543.750.705.877.903 – l-selectin

===== MeSH D12.776.543.750.705.880 – receptors, mitogen =====
- MeSH D12.776.543.750.705.880.600 – receptors, concanavalin a

===== MeSH D12.776.543.750.705.910 – receptors, pattern recognition =====
- MeSH D12.776.543.750.705.910.500 – toll-like receptors
- MeSH D12.776.543.750.705.910.500.100 – toll-like receptor 1
- MeSH D12.776.543.750.705.910.500.200 – toll-like receptor 2
- MeSH D12.776.543.750.705.910.500.300 – toll-like receptor 3
- MeSH D12.776.543.750.705.910.500.400 – toll-like receptor 4
- MeSH D12.776.543.750.705.910.500.500 – toll-like receptor 5
- MeSH D12.776.543.750.705.910.500.600 – toll-like receptor 6
- MeSH D12.776.543.750.705.910.500.700 – toll-like receptor 7
- MeSH D12.776.543.750.705.910.500.800 – toll-like receptor 8
- MeSH D12.776.543.750.705.910.500.900 – toll-like receptor 9
- MeSH D12.776.543.750.705.910.500.910 – toll-like receptor 10

===== MeSH D12.776.543.750.705.940 – receptors, scavenger =====
- MeSH D12.776.543.750.705.940.500 – scavenger receptors, class a
- MeSH D12.776.543.750.705.940.625 – scavenger receptors, class b
- MeSH D12.776.543.750.705.940.625.249 – antigens, cd36
- MeSH D12.776.543.750.705.940.687 – scavenger receptors, class c
- MeSH D12.776.543.750.705.940.718 – scavenger receptors, class d
- MeSH D12.776.543.750.705.940.734 – scavenger receptors, class e
- MeSH D12.776.543.750.705.940.742 – scavenger receptors, class f

==== MeSH D12.776.543.750.710 – receptors, lipoprotein ====
- MeSH D12.776.543.750.710.450 – receptors, ldl
- MeSH D12.776.543.750.710.450.500 – ldl-receptor related proteins
- MeSH D12.776.543.750.710.450.500.100 – ldl-receptor related protein 1
- MeSH D12.776.543.750.710.450.500.200 – ldl-receptor related protein 2
- MeSH D12.776.543.750.710.450.625 – receptors, oxidized ldl
- MeSH D12.776.543.750.710.450.625.500 – scavenger receptors, class e
- MeSH D12.776.543.750.710.450.750 – receptors, scavenger
- MeSH D12.776.543.750.710.450.750.500 – scavenger receptors, class a
- MeSH D12.776.543.750.710.450.750.625 – scavenger receptors, class b
- MeSH D12.776.543.750.710.450.750.625.249 – antigens, cd36
- MeSH D12.776.543.750.710.450.750.687 – scavenger receptors, class c
- MeSH D12.776.543.750.710.450.750.718 – scavenger receptors, class d
- MeSH D12.776.543.750.710.450.750.734 – scavenger receptors, class e
- MeSH D12.776.543.750.710.450.750.742 – scavenger receptors, class f

==== MeSH D12.776.543.750.720 – receptors, neurotransmitter ====
- MeSH D12.776.543.750.720.200 – receptors, amino acid
- MeSH D12.776.543.750.720.200.300 – receptors, gaba
- MeSH D12.776.543.750.720.200.300.300 – receptors, gaba-a
- MeSH D12.776.543.750.720.200.300.320 – receptors, gaba-b
- MeSH D12.776.543.750.720.200.450 – receptors, glutamate
- MeSH D12.776.543.750.720.200.450.200 – receptors, ampa
- MeSH D12.776.543.750.720.200.450.400 – receptors, kainic acid
- MeSH D12.776.543.750.720.200.450.500 – receptors, metabotropic glutamate
- MeSH D12.776.543.750.720.200.450.580 – receptors, n-methyl-d-aspartate
- MeSH D12.776.543.750.720.200.470 – receptors, glycine
- MeSH D12.776.543.750.720.300 – receptors, biogenic amine
- MeSH D12.776.543.750.720.300.300 – receptors, catecholamine
- MeSH D12.776.543.750.720.300.300.300 – receptors, adrenergic
- MeSH D12.776.543.750.720.300.300.300.300 – receptors, adrenergic, alpha
- MeSH D12.776.543.750.720.300.300.300.300.100 – receptors, adrenergic, alpha-1
- MeSH D12.776.543.750.720.300.300.300.300.200 – receptors, adrenergic, alpha-2
- MeSH D12.776.543.750.720.300.300.300.340 – receptors, adrenergic, beta
- MeSH D12.776.543.750.720.300.300.300.340.100 – receptors, adrenergic, beta-1
- MeSH D12.776.543.750.720.300.300.300.340.200 – receptors, adrenergic, beta-2
- MeSH D12.776.543.750.720.300.300.300.340.300 – receptors, adrenergic, beta-3
- MeSH D12.776.543.750.720.300.300.400 – receptors, dopamine
- MeSH D12.776.543.750.720.300.300.400.400 – receptors, dopamine d1
- MeSH D12.776.543.750.720.300.300.400.400.500 – receptors, dopamine d5
- MeSH D12.776.543.750.720.300.300.400.500 – receptors, dopamine d2
- MeSH D12.776.543.750.720.300.300.400.500.249 – receptors, dopamine d3
- MeSH D12.776.543.750.720.300.300.400.500.500 – receptors, dopamine d4
- MeSH D12.776.543.750.720.300.450 – receptors, histamine
- MeSH D12.776.543.750.720.300.450.300 – receptors, histamine h1
- MeSH D12.776.543.750.720.300.450.400 – receptors, histamine h2
- MeSH D12.776.543.750.720.300.450.500 – receptors, histamine h3
- MeSH D12.776.543.750.720.300.800 – receptors, serotonin
- MeSH D12.776.543.750.720.300.800.100 – receptors, serotonin, 5-ht1
- MeSH D12.776.543.750.720.300.800.100.100 – receptor, serotonin, 5-ht1a
- MeSH D12.776.543.750.720.300.800.100.150 – receptor, serotonin, 5-ht1b
- MeSH D12.776.543.750.720.300.800.100.200 – receptor, serotonin, 5-ht1d
- MeSH D12.776.543.750.720.300.800.200 – receptors, serotonin, 5-ht2
- MeSH D12.776.543.750.720.300.800.200.100 – receptor, serotonin, 5-ht2a
- MeSH D12.776.543.750.720.300.800.200.150 – receptor, serotonin, 5-ht2b
- MeSH D12.776.543.750.720.300.800.200.200 – receptor, serotonin, 5-ht2c
- MeSH D12.776.543.750.720.300.800.300 – receptors, serotonin, 5-ht3
- MeSH D12.776.543.750.720.300.800.400 – receptors, serotonin, 5-ht4
- MeSH D12.776.543.750.720.360 – receptors, cholinergic
- MeSH D12.776.543.750.720.360.500 – receptors, muscarinic
- MeSH D12.776.543.750.720.360.500.099 – receptor, muscarinic m1
- MeSH D12.776.543.750.720.360.500.200 – receptor, muscarinic m2
- MeSH D12.776.543.750.720.360.500.300 – receptor, muscarinic m3
- MeSH D12.776.543.750.720.360.500.400 – receptor, muscarinic m4
- MeSH D12.776.543.750.720.360.500.500 – receptor, muscarinic m5
- MeSH D12.776.543.750.720.360.550 – receptors, nicotinic
- MeSH D12.776.543.750.720.600 – receptors, neuropeptide
- MeSH D12.776.543.750.720.600.150 – receptors, angiotensin
- MeSH D12.776.543.750.720.600.150.625 – receptor, angiotensin, type 1
- MeSH D12.776.543.750.720.600.150.687 – receptor, angiotensin, type 2
- MeSH D12.776.543.750.720.600.170 – receptors, atrial natriuretic factor
- MeSH D12.776.543.750.720.600.200 – receptors, bombesin
- MeSH D12.776.543.750.720.600.220 – receptors, bradykinin
- MeSH D12.776.543.750.720.600.220.249 – receptor, bradykinin b1
- MeSH D12.776.543.750.720.600.220.500 – receptor, bradykinin b2
- MeSH D12.776.543.750.720.600.250 – receptors, calcitonin
- MeSH D12.776.543.750.720.600.260 – receptors, calcitonin gene-related peptide
- MeSH D12.776.543.750.720.600.270 – receptors, cholecystokinin
- MeSH D12.776.543.750.720.600.270.100 – receptor, cholecystokinin a
- MeSH D12.776.543.750.720.600.270.200 – receptor, cholecystokinin b
- MeSH D12.776.543.750.720.600.285 – receptors, corticotropin
- MeSH D12.776.543.750.720.600.285.500 – receptors, melanocortin
- MeSH D12.776.543.750.720.600.285.500.500 – receptor, melanocortin, type 1
- MeSH D12.776.543.750.720.600.285.500.750 – receptor, melanocortin, type 2
- MeSH D12.776.543.750.720.600.285.500.875 – receptor, melanocortin, type 3
- MeSH D12.776.543.750.720.600.285.500.937 – receptor, melanocortin, type 4
- MeSH D12.776.543.750.720.600.290 – receptors, corticotropin-releasing hormone
- MeSH D12.776.543.750.720.600.370 – receptors, fsh
- MeSH D12.776.543.750.720.600.410 – receptors, galanin
- MeSH D12.776.543.750.720.600.450 – receptors, lh
- MeSH D12.776.543.750.720.600.460 – receptors, lhrh
- MeSH D12.776.543.750.720.600.540 – receptors, neuropeptide y
- MeSH D12.776.543.750.720.600.560 – receptors, neurotensin
- MeSH D12.776.543.750.720.600.610 – receptors, opioid
- MeSH D12.776.543.750.720.600.610.200 – receptors, opioid, delta
- MeSH D12.776.543.750.720.600.610.400 – receptors, opioid, kappa
- MeSH D12.776.543.750.720.600.610.550 – receptors, opioid, mu
- MeSH D12.776.543.750.720.600.610.775 – receptors, sigma
- MeSH D12.776.543.750.720.600.630 – receptors, oxytocin
- MeSH D12.776.543.750.720.600.710 – receptors, prolactin
- MeSH D12.776.543.750.720.600.760 – receptors, somatostatin
- MeSH D12.776.543.750.720.600.830 – receptors, tachykinin
- MeSH D12.776.543.750.720.600.830.500 – receptors, neurokinin-1
- MeSH D12.776.543.750.720.600.830.540 – receptors, neurokinin-2
- MeSH D12.776.543.750.720.600.830.580 – receptors, neurokinin-3
- MeSH D12.776.543.750.720.600.850 – receptors, thyrotropin
- MeSH D12.776.543.750.720.600.860 – receptors, thyrotropin-releasing hormone
- MeSH D12.776.543.750.720.600.915 – receptors, vasoactive intestinal peptide
- MeSH D12.776.543.750.720.600.925 – receptors, vasopressin
- MeSH D12.776.543.750.720.670 – receptors, presynaptic
- MeSH D12.776.543.750.720.670.100 – autoreceptors
- MeSH D12.776.543.750.720.670.100.500 – receptor, serotonin, 5-ht1b
- MeSH D12.776.543.750.720.670.100.750 – receptor, serotonin, 5-ht1d
- MeSH D12.776.543.750.720.700 – receptors, purinergic
- MeSH D12.776.543.750.720.700.150 – receptors, cyclic amp
- MeSH D12.776.543.750.720.700.700 – receptors, purinergic p1
- MeSH D12.776.543.750.720.700.700.100 – receptor, adenosine a1
- MeSH D12.776.543.750.720.700.700.200 – receptors, adenosine a2
- MeSH D12.776.543.750.720.700.700.200.100 – receptor, adenosine a2a
- MeSH D12.776.543.750.720.700.700.200.200 – receptor, adenosine a2b
- MeSH D12.776.543.750.720.700.700.300 – receptor, adenosine a3
- MeSH D12.776.543.750.720.700.720 – receptors, purinergic p2

==== MeSH D12.776.543.750.725 – receptors, notch ====
- MeSH D12.776.543.750.725.500 – receptor, notch1
- MeSH D12.776.543.750.725.750 – receptor, notch2

==== MeSH D12.776.543.750.750 – receptors, peptide ====
===== MeSH D12.776.543.750.750.130 – receptors, angiotensin =====
- MeSH D12.776.543.750.750.130.750 – receptor, angiotensin, type 1
- MeSH D12.776.543.750.750.130.875 – receptor, angiotensin, type 2

===== MeSH D12.776.543.750.750.320 – receptors, endothelin =====
- MeSH D12.776.543.750.750.320.100 – receptor, endothelin a
- MeSH D12.776.543.750.750.320.200 – receptor, endothelin b

===== MeSH D12.776.543.750.750.360 – receptors, gastrointestinal hormone =====
- MeSH D12.776.543.750.750.360.200 – receptors, cholecystokinin
- MeSH D12.776.543.750.750.360.200.100 – receptor, cholecystokinin a
- MeSH D12.776.543.750.750.360.200.200 – receptor, cholecystokinin b
- MeSH D12.776.543.750.750.360.300 – receptor, epidermal growth factor
- MeSH D12.776.543.750.750.360.900 – receptors, vasoactive intestinal peptide

===== MeSH D12.776.543.750.750.400 – receptors, growth factor =====
- MeSH D12.776.543.750.750.400.049 – bone morphogenetic protein receptors
- MeSH D12.776.543.750.750.400.049.500 – bone morphogenetic protein receptors, type i
- MeSH D12.776.543.750.750.400.049.750 – bone morphogenetic protein receptors, type ii
- MeSH D12.776.543.750.750.400.100 – proto-oncogene proteins c-met
- MeSH D12.776.543.750.750.400.200 – receptors, colony-stimulating factor
- MeSH D12.776.543.750.750.400.200.170 – proto-oncogene proteins c-kit
- MeSH D12.776.543.750.750.400.200.200 – receptor, macrophage colony-stimulating factor
- MeSH D12.776.543.750.750.400.200.340 – receptors, erythropoietin
- MeSH D12.776.543.750.750.400.200.400 – receptors, granulocyte colony-stimulating factor
- MeSH D12.776.543.750.750.400.200.420 – receptors, granulocyte-macrophage colony-stimulating factor
- MeSH D12.776.543.750.750.400.200.480 – receptors, interleukin-3
- MeSH D12.776.543.750.750.400.340 – receptor, epidermal growth factor
- MeSH D12.776.543.750.750.400.350 – receptor, erbb-2
- MeSH D12.776.543.750.750.400.360 – receptor, erbb-3
- MeSH D12.776.543.750.750.400.370 – receptors, fibroblast growth factor
- MeSH D12.776.543.750.750.400.370.500 – receptor, fibroblast growth factor, type 1
- MeSH D12.776.543.750.750.400.370.750 – receptor, fibroblast growth factor, type 2
- MeSH D12.776.543.750.750.400.370.875 – receptor, fibroblast growth factor, type 3
- MeSH D12.776.543.750.750.400.370.937 – receptor, fibroblast growth factor, type 4
- MeSH D12.776.543.750.750.400.370.968 – receptor, fibroblast growth factor, type 5
- MeSH D12.776.543.750.750.400.550 – receptors, nerve growth factor
- MeSH D12.776.543.750.750.400.550.124 – glial cell line-derived neurotrophic factor receptors
- MeSH D12.776.543.750.750.400.550.250 – receptor, ciliary neurotrophic factor
- MeSH D12.776.543.750.750.400.550.500 – receptor, nerve growth factor
- MeSH D12.776.543.750.750.400.550.550 – receptor, trka
- MeSH D12.776.543.750.750.400.550.600 – receptor, trkb
- MeSH D12.776.543.750.750.400.550.700 – receptor, trkc
- MeSH D12.776.543.750.750.400.630 – receptors, platelet-derived growth factor
- MeSH D12.776.543.750.750.400.630.300 – receptor, platelet-derived growth factor alpha
- MeSH D12.776.543.750.750.400.630.400 – receptor, platelet-derived growth factor beta
- MeSH D12.776.543.750.750.400.780 – receptors, somatomedin
- MeSH D12.776.543.750.750.400.780.400 – receptor, igf type 1
- MeSH D12.776.543.750.750.400.780.410 – receptor, igf type 2
- MeSH D12.776.543.750.750.400.820 – receptors, transforming growth factor beta
- MeSH D12.776.543.750.750.400.820.500 – activin receptors
- MeSH D12.776.543.750.750.400.820.500.500 – activin receptors, type i
- MeSH D12.776.543.750.750.400.820.500.750 – activin receptors, type ii
- MeSH D12.776.543.750.750.400.910 – receptors, vascular endothelial growth factor
- MeSH D12.776.543.750.750.400.910.100 – vascular endothelial growth factor receptor-1
- MeSH D12.776.543.750.750.400.910.200 – vascular endothelial growth factor receptor 2
- MeSH D12.776.543.750.750.400.910.300 – vascular endothelial growth factor receptor-3

===== MeSH D12.776.543.750.750.555 – receptors, neuropeptide =====
- MeSH D12.776.543.750.750.555.150 – receptors, angiotensin
- MeSH D12.776.543.750.750.555.150.750 – receptor, angiotensin, type 1
- MeSH D12.776.543.750.750.555.150.875 – receptor, angiotensin, type 2
- MeSH D12.776.543.750.750.555.170 – receptors, atrial natriuretic factor
- MeSH D12.776.543.750.750.555.200 – receptors, bombesin
- MeSH D12.776.543.750.750.555.220 – receptors, bradykinin
- MeSH D12.776.543.750.750.555.220.249 – receptor, bradykinin b1
- MeSH D12.776.543.750.750.555.220.500 – receptor, bradykinin b2
- MeSH D12.776.543.750.750.555.250 – receptors, calcitonin
- MeSH D12.776.543.750.750.555.260 – receptors, calcitonin gene-related peptide
- MeSH D12.776.543.750.750.555.270 – receptors, cholecystokinin
- MeSH D12.776.543.750.750.555.270.100 – receptor, cholecystokinin a
- MeSH D12.776.543.750.750.555.270.200 – receptor, cholecystokinin b
- MeSH D12.776.543.750.750.555.285 – receptors, corticotropin
- MeSH D12.776.543.750.750.555.285.500 – receptors, melanocortin
- MeSH D12.776.543.750.750.555.285.500.500 – receptor, melanocortin, type 1
- MeSH D12.776.543.750.750.555.285.500.750 – receptor, melanocortin, type 2
- MeSH D12.776.543.750.750.555.285.500.875 – receptor, melanocortin, type 3
- MeSH D12.776.543.750.750.555.285.500.937 – receptor, melanocortin, type 4
- MeSH D12.776.543.750.750.555.290 – receptors, corticotropin-releasing hormone
- MeSH D12.776.543.750.750.555.370 – receptors, fsh
- MeSH D12.776.543.750.750.555.410 – receptors, galanin
- MeSH D12.776.543.750.750.555.450 – receptors, lh
- MeSH D12.776.543.750.750.555.460 – receptors, lhrh
- MeSH D12.776.543.750.750.555.540 – receptors, neuropeptide y
- MeSH D12.776.543.750.750.555.560 – receptors, neurotensin
- MeSH D12.776.543.750.750.555.610 – receptors, opioid
- MeSH D12.776.543.750.750.555.610.200 – receptors, opioid, delta
- MeSH D12.776.543.750.750.555.610.400 – receptors, opioid, kappa
- MeSH D12.776.543.750.750.555.610.550 – receptors, opioid, mu
- MeSH D12.776.543.750.750.555.610.775 – receptors, sigma
- MeSH D12.776.543.750.750.555.630 – receptors, oxytocin
- MeSH D12.776.543.750.750.555.710 – receptors, prolactin
- MeSH D12.776.543.750.750.555.760 – receptors, somatostatin
- MeSH D12.776.543.750.750.555.770 – receptors, somatotropin
- MeSH D12.776.543.750.750.555.830 – receptors, tachykinin
- MeSH D12.776.543.750.750.555.830.500 – receptors, neurokinin-1
- MeSH D12.776.543.750.750.555.830.540 – receptors, neurokinin-2
- MeSH D12.776.543.750.750.555.830.580 – receptors, neurokinin-3
- MeSH D12.776.543.750.750.555.850 – receptors, thyrotropin
- MeSH D12.776.543.750.750.555.860 – receptors, thyrotropin-releasing hormone
- MeSH D12.776.543.750.750.555.915 – receptors, vasoactive intestinal peptide
- MeSH D12.776.543.750.750.555.925 – receptors, vasopressin

===== MeSH D12.776.543.750.750.580 – receptors, pancreatic hormone =====
- MeSH D12.776.543.750.750.580.300 – receptor, insulin
- MeSH D12.776.543.750.750.580.350 – receptors, glucagon
- MeSH D12.776.543.750.750.580.720 – receptors, somatostatin

===== MeSH D12.776.543.750.750.600 – receptors, parathyroid hormone =====
- MeSH D12.776.543.750.750.600.100 – receptor, parathyroid hormone, type 1
- MeSH D12.776.543.750.750.600.200 – receptor, parathyroid hormone, type 2

===== MeSH D12.776.543.750.750.660 – receptors, pituitary hormone =====
- MeSH D12.776.543.750.750.660.285 – receptors, corticotropin
- MeSH D12.776.543.750.750.660.285.500 – receptors, melanocortin
- MeSH D12.776.543.750.750.660.285.500.500 – receptor, melanocortin, type 1
- MeSH D12.776.543.750.750.660.285.500.750 – receptor, melanocortin, type 2
- MeSH D12.776.543.750.750.660.285.500.875 – receptor, melanocortin, type 3
- MeSH D12.776.543.750.750.660.285.500.937 – receptor, melanocortin, type 4
- MeSH D12.776.543.750.750.660.350 – receptors, gonadotropin
- MeSH D12.776.543.750.750.660.350.300 – receptors, fsh
- MeSH D12.776.543.750.750.660.350.450 – receptors, lh
- MeSH D12.776.543.750.750.660.350.725 – receptors, prolactin
- MeSH D12.776.543.750.750.660.600 – receptors, oxytocin
- MeSH D12.776.543.750.750.660.750 – receptors, somatotropin
- MeSH D12.776.543.750.750.660.825 – receptors, thyrotropin
- MeSH D12.776.543.750.750.660.900 – receptors, vasopressin

===== MeSH D12.776.543.750.750.700 – receptors, pituitary hormone-regulating hormone =====
- MeSH D12.776.543.750.750.700.150 – receptors, corticotropin-releasing hormone
- MeSH D12.776.543.750.750.700.460 – receptors, lhrh
- MeSH D12.776.543.750.750.700.800 – receptors, somatostatin
- MeSH D12.776.543.750.750.700.840 – receptors, thyrotropin-releasing hormone

===== MeSH D12.776.543.750.750.850 – receptors, thrombin =====
- MeSH D12.776.543.750.750.850.399 – receptor, par-1
- MeSH D12.776.543.750.750.850.800 – thrombomodulin

==== MeSH D12.776.543.750.775 – receptors, pheromone ====
- MeSH D12.776.543.750.775.500 – receptors, mating factor

==== MeSH D12.776.543.750.792 – receptors, proteinase-activated ====
- MeSH D12.776.543.750.792.249 – receptor, par-2
- MeSH D12.776.543.750.792.500 – receptors, thrombin
- MeSH D12.776.543.750.792.500.500 – receptor, par-1

==== MeSH D12.776.543.750.810 – receptors, purinergic ====
- MeSH D12.776.543.750.810.150 – receptors, cyclic amp
- MeSH D12.776.543.750.810.700 – receptors, purinergic p1
- MeSH D12.776.543.750.810.700.100 – receptor, adenosine a1
- MeSH D12.776.543.750.810.700.200 – receptors, adenosine a2
- MeSH D12.776.543.750.810.700.200.100 – receptor, adenosine a2a
- MeSH D12.776.543.750.810.700.200.200 – receptor, adenosine a2b
- MeSH D12.776.543.750.810.700.300 – receptor, adenosine a3
- MeSH D12.776.543.750.810.720 – receptors, purinergic p2

==== MeSH D12.776.543.750.850 – receptors, transferrin ====
- MeSH D12.776.543.750.850.249 – bacterial transferrin receptor complex
- MeSH D12.776.543.750.850.249.500 – transferrin-binding protein a
- MeSH D12.776.543.750.850.249.750 – transferrin-binding protein b

==== MeSH D12.776.543.750.925 – receptors, virus ====
- MeSH D12.776.543.750.925.250 – receptors, complement 3d
- MeSH D12.776.543.750.925.700 – receptors, hiv
- MeSH D12.776.543.750.925.700.025 – antigens, cd4
- MeSH D12.776.543.750.925.700.605 – receptors, ccr5
- MeSH D12.776.543.750.925.700.650 – receptors, cxcr4

=== MeSH D12.776.543.990 – vesicular transport proteins ===
==== MeSH D12.776.543.990.100 – caveolins ====
- MeSH D12.776.543.990.100.500 – caveolin 1
- MeSH D12.776.543.990.100.750 – caveolin 2
- MeSH D12.776.543.990.100.875 – caveolin 3

==== MeSH D12.776.543.990.150 – adaptor proteins, vesicular transport ====
- MeSH D12.776.543.990.150.100 – adaptor protein complex 1
- MeSH D12.776.543.990.150.200 – adaptor protein complex 2
- MeSH D12.776.543.990.150.300 – adaptor protein complex 3
- MeSH D12.776.543.990.150.400 – adaptor protein complex 4
- MeSH D12.776.543.990.150.500 – adaptor protein complex subunits
- MeSH D12.776.543.990.150.500.100 – adaptor protein complex alpha subunits
- MeSH D12.776.543.990.150.500.200 – adaptor protein complex beta subunits
- MeSH D12.776.543.990.150.500.300 – adaptor protein complex delta subunits
- MeSH D12.776.543.990.150.500.400 – adaptor protein complex gamma subunits
- MeSH D12.776.543.990.150.500.500 – adaptor protein complex mu subunits
- MeSH D12.776.543.990.150.500.750 – adaptor protein complex sigma subunits
- MeSH D12.776.543.990.150.750 – monomeric clathrin assembly proteins

==== MeSH D12.776.543.990.200 – clathrin ====
- MeSH D12.776.543.990.200.500 – clathrin heavy chains
- MeSH D12.776.543.990.200.750 – clathrin light chains

==== MeSH D12.776.543.990.300 – coat protein complex i ====
- MeSH D12.776.543.990.300.150 – ADP-ribosylation factor 1
- MeSH D12.776.543.990.300.300 – coatomer protein

==== MeSH D12.776.543.990.400 – dynamins ====
- MeSH D12.776.543.990.400.100 – dynamin i
- MeSH D12.776.543.990.400.200 – dynamin ii
- MeSH D12.776.543.990.400.300 – dynamin iii

==== MeSH D12.776.543.990.775 – snare proteins ====
- MeSH D12.776.543.990.775.500 – q-snare proteins
- MeSH D12.776.543.990.775.500.500 – qa-snare proteins
- MeSH D12.776.543.990.775.500.500.700 – syntaxin 1
- MeSH D12.776.543.990.775.500.500.750 – syntaxin 16
- MeSH D12.776.543.990.775.500.750 – qb-snare proteins
- MeSH D12.776.543.990.775.500.750.500 – synaptosomal-associated protein 25
- MeSH D12.776.543.990.775.500.875 – qc-snare proteins
- MeSH D12.776.543.990.775.500.875.500 – synaptosomal-associated protein 25
- MeSH D12.776.543.990.775.750 – r-snare proteins
- MeSH D12.776.543.990.775.750.500 – vesicle-associated membrane protein 1
- MeSH D12.776.543.990.775.750.750 – vesicle-associated membrane protein 2
- MeSH D12.776.543.990.775.750.875 – vesicle-associated membrane protein 3

==== MeSH D12.776.543.990.850 – synaptotagmins ====
- MeSH D12.776.543.990.850.249 – synaptotagmin i
- MeSH D12.776.543.990.850.500 – synaptotagmin ii

The list continues at List of MeSH codes (D12.776) § MeSH D12.776.556.
