= Variant surface glycoprotein =

Variable surface glycoprotein

Identifiers
- Organism: Trypanosoma brucei
- Symbol: Tb927.5.4730
- Alt. symbols: Tb05.26C7.380
- Entrez: 3657576
- Orthologs: NCBI: entry

Other data
- Chromosome: 5: 1.41 - 1.41 Mb

Variant surface glycoprotein MITAT 1.2

Identifiers
- Organism: Trypanosoma brucei
- Symbol: N/A
- Alt. symbols: VSG 221
- Orthologs: OMA: entry
- UniProt: P26332
Search for
- Structures: Swiss-model
- Domains: InterPro

Variant surface glycoprotein (VSG) is a ~60kDa protein which densely packs the cell surface of protozoan parasites belonging to the genus Trypanosoma. This genus is notable for their cell surface proteins. They were first isolated from Trypanosoma brucei in 1975 by George Cross. VSG allows the trypanosomatid parasites to evade the mammalian host's immune system by extensive antigenic variation. They form a 12–15 nm surface coat. VSG dimers make up ~90% of all cell surface protein and ~10% of total cell protein. For this reason, these proteins are highly immunogenic and an immune response raised against a specific VSG coat will rapidly kill trypanosomes expressing this variant. However, with each cell division there is a possibility that the progeny will switch expression to change the VSG that is being expressed. VSG has no prescribed biochemical activity.

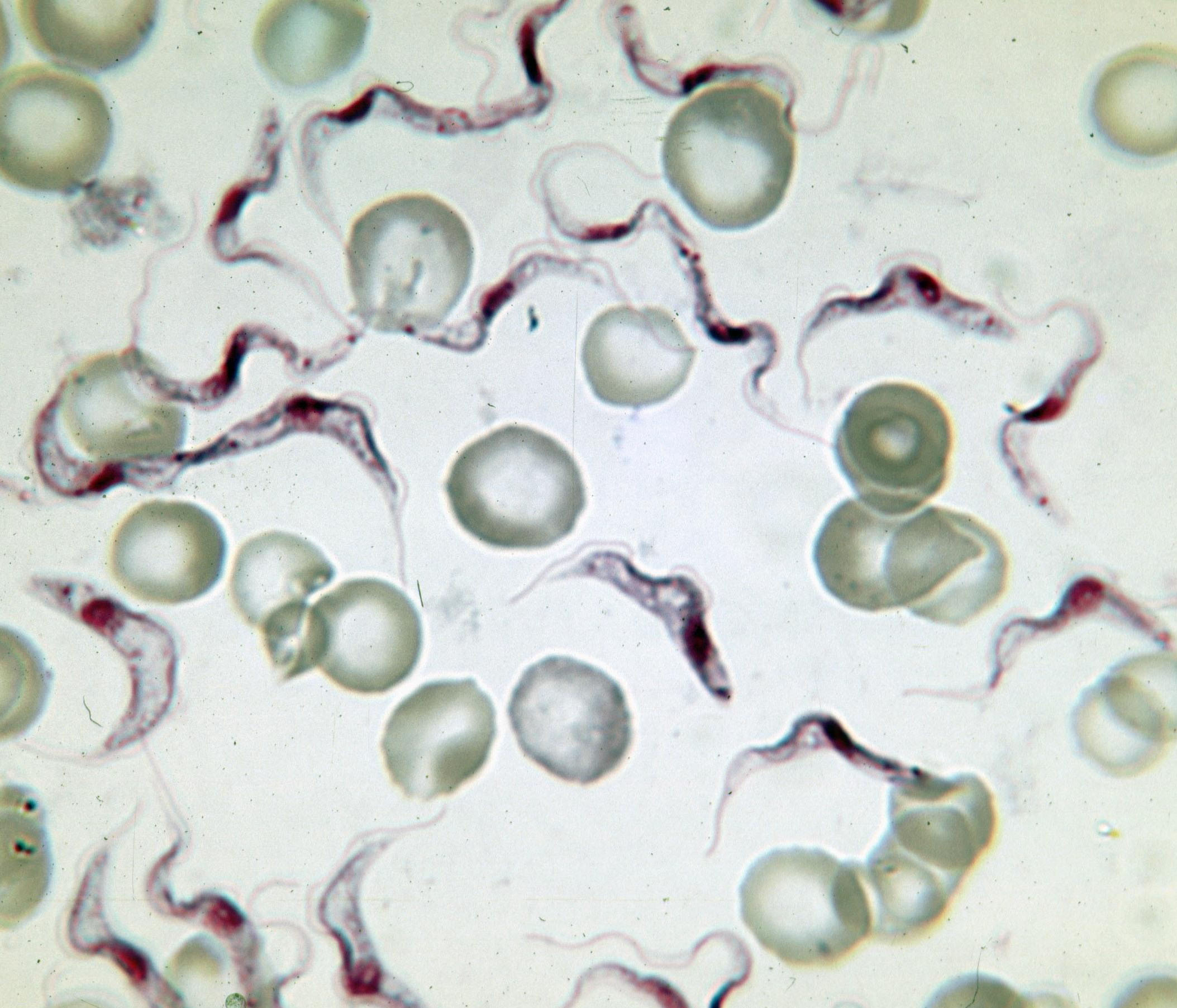
The Trypanosoma brucei cell membrane is densely packed with VSG dimers, which make up ~90% of its cell surface protein, and which allows for the parasite to evade the immune system and establish chronic infection.

The parasite has a large cellular repertoire of antigenically distinct VSGs (~1500/2000 complete and partial (pseudogenes)) located in telomeric and subtelomeric arrays (on megabase chromosomes or minichromosomes). VSGs are expressed from a bloodstream expression site (BES, ES) in a polycistron by RNA polymerase I (recruited to a ribosomal-type promoter) with other ES-associated genes (ESAGs), of which transferrin receptor (Tfr: ESAG6, ESAG7) is one. Only one VSG gene is expressed at a time, as only one of the ~15 ES are active in a cell. VSG expression is 'switched' by homologous recombination of a silent basic copy gene from an array (directed by homology) into the active telomerically located expression site. During this transition, trypanosomes simultaneously display both pre- and post-switch VSGs on their surface. This coat replacement process is critical for the survival of recently switched cells because initial VSGs remain targets for the escalating host Ab response. Mosaic VSG genes can be created by homologous recombination of a partial VSG gene from an array. This partial gene may replace any portion of the residing VSG gene, creating a new mosaic VSG. VSG half-life measurements suggest that initial VSGs may persist on the surface of genetically switched trypanosomes for several days. It remains unclear whether the regulation of VSG switching is purely stochastic or whether environmental stimuli affect switching frequency. The fact that switching occurs in vitro suggests that there is at least some host-independent, stochastic element to the process.

The antigenic variation causes cyclical waves of parasitemia, which is one of the characteristics of human African trypanosomiasis. The cyclical process take 5–8 days. This occurs because a diverse range of coats expressed by the trypanosome population means that the immune system is always one step behind: it takes several days for an immune response against a given VSG to develop, giving the population time to diversify as individuals undergo further switching events. The repetition of this process prevents the extinction of the infecting trypanosome population, allowing chronic persistence of parasites in the host and enhancing opportunities for transmission.

== In Trypanosoma brucei ==
In Trypanosoma brucei, the cell surface is covered by a dense coat of ~5 million VSG dimers, ~90% of all cell surface protein and ~10% of total cell protein.

The properties of the VSG coat that enable immune evasion are:

- Shielding – the dense nature of the VSG coat (VSG proteins pack shoulder-to-shoulder) prevents the immune system of the mammalian host from accessing the plasma membrane or any other parasitic invariant surface epitopes (such as ion channels, transporters, receptors etc.). The coat is uniform, made up of millions of copies of the same molecule; therefore, VSG is the only part of the trypanosome that the immune system can recognize.
- Periodic antigenic variation – the VSG coat undergoes frequent stochastic genetic modification—'switching'—allowing variants expressing a new VSG coat to escape the specific immune response raised against the previous coat. This antigenic variation creates cyclical waves of parasitemia characteristic of Human African Trypanosomiasis.
- Antigen 'cleaning' and VSG recycling—VSG is efficiently recycled through the trypanosome flagellar pocket, allowing antibodies to be 'cleaned' from VSG before re-incorporation back into the cellular membrane. Importantly, VSGs recognized and bound by antibodies are selectively pushed toward the flagellar pocket at a quicker rate than unidentified VSG; in this scenario, the antibody acts as a 'sail', which quickens the process of VSG being brought to the area of recycling.

The VSGs from T. brucei are attached to the plasma membrane via a covalent attachment to two glycosyl-phosphatidylinositol (GPI) anchors (one per monomer), which directs its forward-trafficking from the ER to the flagellar pocket for incorporation into the membrane, as predicted by the GPI valence hypothesis.

VSGs are replaced by an equally dense coat of procyclins when the parasite differentiates into the procyclic form in the tsetse fly midgut. There is a very fast inhibition of VSG gene transcription which occurs as soon as the temperature is lowered.

=== Expression ===
The source of VSG variability during infection is a large 'archive' of VSG genes present in the T. brucei genome. Some of these are full-length, intact genes; others are pseudogenes (typically with frameshift mutations, premature stop codons, or fragmentation). Expression of an antigenically different VSG can occur by simply switching to a different full-length VSG gene by Expression Site switching (switching which ES is active). In addition, chimeric or 'mosaic' VSG genes can be generated by combining segments from more than one silent VSG gene. The formation of mosaic VSGs allows the (partial) expression of pseudogene VSGs, which can constitute the major portion of the VSG archive, and can contribute directly to antigenic variation, vastly increasing the trypanosome's capacity for immune evasion and posing a major problem for vaccine development.

VSG genes can be kept silent and switched on at any given time. The expressed VSG is always located in an Expression Site (ES), which are specialised expression loci found at the telomeres of some of the large and intermediate chromosomes. Each ES is a polycistronic unit, containing a number of Expression Site-Associated Genes (ESAGs) all expressed along with the active VSG. While multiple ES exist, only a single one is ever active at one time. A number of mechanisms appear to be involved in this process, but the exact nature of the silencing is still unclear.

The expressed VSG can be switched either by activating a different expression site (and thus changing to express the VSG in that site), or by changing the VSG gene in the active site to a different variant. The genome contains many copies of VSG genes, both on minichromosomes and in repeated sections in the interior of the chromosomes. These are generally silent, typically with omitted sections or premature stop codons, but are important in the evolution of new VSG genes. It is estimated up to 10% of the T.brucei genome may be made up of VSG genes or pseudogenes. Any of these genes can be moved into the active site by recombination for expression. Again, the exact mechanisms that control this are unclear, but the process seems to rely on DNA repair machinery and a process of homologous recombination.

The bloodstream expression site (BES), or telomeric expression site, is used for exchanging variant surface glycoproteins when in host's blood stream to escape the complement system. BESs are polymorphic in size and structure but reveal a surprisingly conserved architecture in the context of extensive recombination. Very small BESs do exist and many functioning BESs do not contain the full complement of expression site associated genes (ESAGs). There is a collection of an estimated 20-30 sites, each being active at a time. Active VSG expression sites are depleted of nucleosomes.

The gene repertoires in T. brucei have diverged to become strain-specific.

The variant surface glycoprotein genes of T. brucei have been classified into two groups depending upon whether or not duplication of the genes is observed when they are expressed.

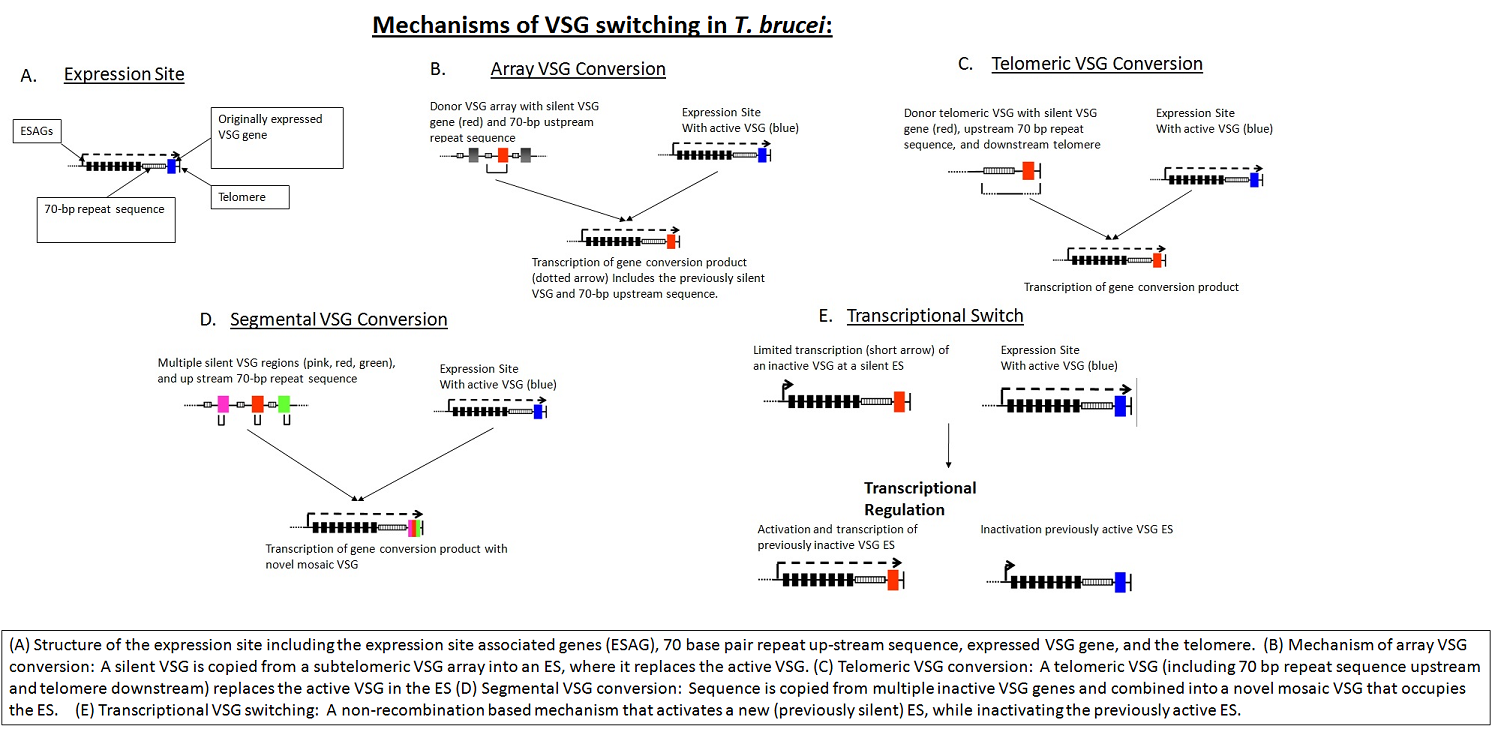
Mechanisms of VSG switching in T. brucei: A. Structure of the expression site including the expression site associated genes (ESAG), 70 base pair repeat up-stream sequence, expressed VSG gene, and the telomere B. Mechanism of array VSG conversion: A silent VSG is copied from a subtelomeric VSG array into an ES, where it replaces the active VSG. C. Telomeric VSG conversion: A telomeric VSG (including 70 bp repeat sequence upstream and telomere downstream) replaces the active VSG in the ES D. Segmental VSG conversion: Sequence is copied from multiple inactive VSG genes and combined into a novel mosaic VSG that occupies the ES E. Transcriptional VSG switching: A non-recombination based mechanism that activates a new (previously silent) ES, while inactivating the previously active ES.

=== Secretory trafficking ===
Trypanosoma have a simple, polarized membrane transport system consisting of a single ER, lysosome, and Golgi apparatus.

VSG is first transcribed as a polycistron and then undergoes trypanosomatid-specific poly-adenylation and trans-splicing directed by polypyrimidine tracts. Because there is no transcriptional control, the VSG 3'UTR is important for its RNA stability (most importantly, the 8mer and 14mer). VSG is then transcribed on membrane-bound polysomes, and the appearance of the N-terminal signal sequence directs VSG to the ER. VSG is thereby co-translationally transported into the ER lumen, rapidly N-glycosylated (on asn-x-ser/thr sites) and GPI anchored at the ω site by a transamination reaction (removing of the C-term hydrophobic 17 or 23 aa GPI anchoring sequence). The ω site is always Ser (usually in 17 aa signal sequence peptides), Asp (usually in 23 aa signal sequence peptides), or Asn. Also, the number of N-glycosylation sites per VSG may vary (usually 1-3 N-glycans). VSG MITat.1.5 is glycosylated at all three potential N-glycosylation sites.

VSG then undergoes the calreticulin/calnexin folding cycle (calnexin is absent in Trypanosoma brucei), where it is transiently monoglucosylated and deglucosylated, and interacts with various ER chaperone proteins, such as BiP, in order to fold correctly. VSG efficiently folds and dimerizes (suggesting intrinsically favorable folding) and is transported through the Golgi to the flagellar pocket for incorporation into the cell membrane.

Importantly, following incorporation into the cellular membrane, VSG may later be recycled through the flagellar pocket and sorted back to the cell surface. VSG is not turned over by lysosomal or proteasomal canonical degradation pathways, but is instead lost from the cell by specific cleavage of its GPI anchor by GPI-specific PLC.

=== Structure ===
VSG genes are hugely variable at the sequence (primary) level, but variants are thought to have strongly conserved structural (tertiary) features, based on two determined 3-dimensional structures and conservation of 2-dimensional sequence motifs (descending and ascending alpha-helices that make up the dimerization interface), allowing them to perform a similar shielding function. VSGs are made up of N terminal domain of around 300–350 amino acids with low sequence homology (13–30% identity), and a more conserved C terminal domain of ~100 amino acids. N-terminal domains are grouped into classes A-C depending on their cysteine patterns. C-term domains are grouped by sequence homology into classes I-III, with apparently no restriction on which N-term classes they can pair with to form a full VSG. To dimerize, VSG N-terminal domains form a bundle of four alpha helices directed by hydrophobic interactions, around which hang smaller structural features (five smaller helices and three beta-sheets).

VSG is anchored to the cell membrane via a glycophosphatidylinositol (GPI) anchor—a noncovalent linkage from the C-terminus which directs its forward trafficking from the ER to the membrane. This GPI anchor is specifically cleaved by GPI Phospholipase C, cleaving the membrane-form VSG, and allowing VSG protein and portion of the GPI anchor to be lost into the extracellular milieu as soluble VSG (sVSG, which is can be recognized as Cross-Reacting Determinant, or CRD), while retaining the two 1,2-dimyristolglycerol chains in the membrane.

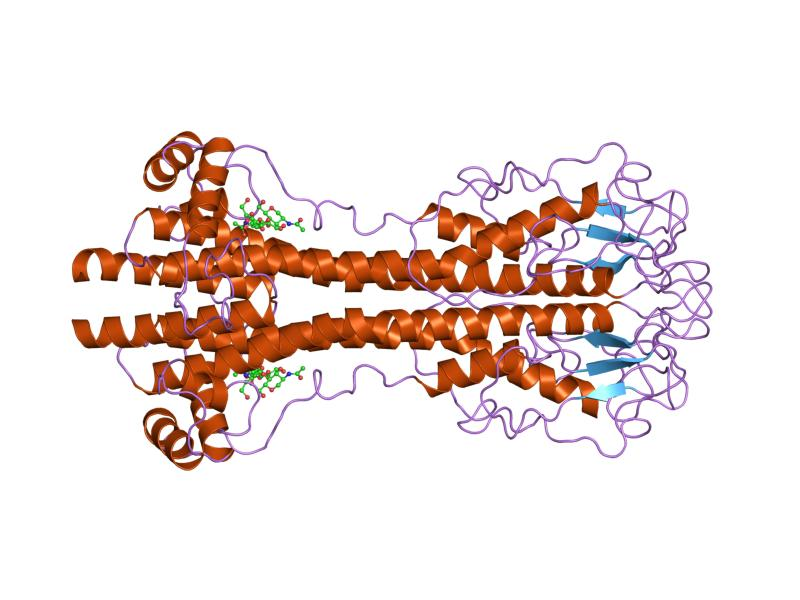
Structure of one of the N-terminal VSG variants. VSG genes have a largely conserved N-terminal secondary and tertiary structure (composed of two alpha-helices which form the dimerization interface, and which couple into a four helix bundle), while still allowing for variable primary sequence. This variable primary sequence allows for VSG to be antigenically distinct from one another, the crux to antigenic variation.

=== Antigenic variation ===
VSG is highly immunogenic, and an immune response raised against a specific VSG coat will rapidly kill trypanosomes expressing this variant. Antibody-mediated trypanosome killing can also be observed in vitro by a complement-mediated lysis assay. However, with each cell division there is a possibility that one or both of the progeny will switch expression to change the VSG that is being expressed. The frequency of VSG switching has been measured to be approximately 0.1% per division, though switching rates do differ in culture vs. in vivo. As T. brucei populations can peak at a size of 10^{11} within a host this rapid rate of switching ensures that the parasite population is constantly diverse. A diverse range of coats expressed by the trypanosome population means that the immune system is always one step behind: it takes several days for an immune response against a given VSG to develop, giving the population time to diversify as individuals undergo further switching events. Reiteration of this process prevents extinction of the infecting trypanosome population, allowing chronic persistence of parasites in the host, enhancing opportunities for transmission. The clinical effect of this cycle is successive 'waves' of parasitaemia (trypanosomes in the blood).

== In other trypanosomes ==
Variable surface glycoproteins are also found in other Trypanosoma species.

In Trypanosoma equiperdum, a parasite causing the covering sickness in horses, these proteins allow the parasite to efficiently evade the host animal's immune system. These VSGs allow the organism to constantly manipulate and change the surface structure of its proteins, which means it is constantly being presented to the immune system as a new foreign organism and this prevents the body from mounting a large enough immune response to eradicate the disease. In this sense, Trypanosoma equiperdum is a very efficient organism; it may infect fewer species than other diseases, but it infects and survives very efficiently within its specified hosts. The VSG proteins in T. equiperdum are also phosphorylated.

A VSG gene from Trypanosoma evansi, a parasite that causes a form of surra in animals, has been cloned in Escherichia coli. The expressed protein is immunoreactive with all the sera combinations. The animals immunized with whole cell lysate or recombinant protein show similar antibody reactions in ELISA (enzyme-linked immunosorbent assay) and CATT (card agglutination test for trypanosomiasis). The variable surface glycoprotein RoTat 1.2 PCR can be used as a specific diagnostic tool for the detection of T. evansi infections.

The smallest VSG protein (40 kDa in size) to date (1996) has been found in Trypanosoma vivax, which bears little carbohydrate.

In Trypanosoma congolense, in vitro analyses of the incorporated sugars after hydrolysis of the glycoprotein showed that glucosamine and mannose are utilized in the biosynthesis of the carbohydrate moiety directly whereas galactose was converted possibly to other intermediates before being incorporated into the antigen. The unglycosylated VSG with a molecular weight of 47 kDa had completely lost its size heterogeneity.

== See also ==
- Amastin, another surface (trans-membrane) glycoprotein in trypanosomatid parasites
- Coat protein (disambiguation)
- Glycocalyx
- List of MeSH codes (D23)
- List of MeSH codes (D12.776.395)
- List of MeSH codes (D12.776.543)
