= Procyclin =

Surface coating protein of trypanosome

Procyclic acidic repetitive

Identifiers
- Symbol: ?
- Pfam: PF05887
- InterPro: IPR008882
Available protein structures:
- Pfam: structures / ECOD
- PDB: RCSB PDB; PDBe; PDBj
- PDBsum: structure summary

EP1 procyclin

Identifiers
- Organism: Trypanosoma brucei
- Symbol: Tb10.6k15.0020
- Entrez: 3661797
- RefSeq (mRNA): XM_818154.1
- RefSeq (Prot): XP_823247.1
- UniProt: Q389V1

Other data
- Chromosome: 10: 2.48 - 2.48 Mb
Search for
- Structures: Swiss-model
- Domains: InterPro

Surface protein EP1-2 procyclin

Identifiers
- Organism: Trypanosoma brucei
- Symbol: EP1-2
- UniProt: Q7KG35
Search for
- Structures: Swiss-model
- Domains: InterPro

EP2 procyclin

Identifiers
- Organism: Trypanosoma brucei
- Symbol: Tb10.6k15.0030
- Entrez: 3661534
- RefSeq (mRNA): XM_818153.1
- RefSeq (Prot): XP_823246.1
- UniProt: Q389V2

Other data
- Chromosome: 10: 2.48 - 2.48 Mb
Search for
- Structures: Swiss-model
- Domains: InterPro

Surface protein EP2-1 procyclin

Identifiers
- Organism: Trypanosoma brucei
- Symbol: EP2-1
- UniProt: Q95PJ2
Search for
- Structures: Swiss-model
- Domains: InterPro

Procyclin EP3

Identifiers
- Organism: Trypanosoma brucei
- Symbol: EP3
- UniProt: Q86MA3
Search for
- Structures: Swiss-model
- Domains: InterPro

EP3-2 procyclin

Identifiers
- Organism: Trypanosoma brucei
- Symbol: Tb927.6.520
- Entrez: 3657688
- RefSeq (mRNA): XM_840082.1
- RefSeq (Prot): XP_845175.1
- UniProt: Q581F6

Other data
- Chromosome: 6: 0.23 - 0.23 Mb
Search for
- Structures: Swiss-model
- Domains: InterPro

Surface protein EP3-3 procyclin

Identifiers
- Organism: Trypanosoma brucei
- Symbol: EP3-3
- UniProt: Q95NW2
Search for
- Structures: Swiss-model
- Domains: InterPro

Surface protein EP3-4 procyclin

Identifiers
- Organism: Trypanosoma brucei
- Symbol: EP3-4
- UniProt: Q95PJ3
Search for
- Structures: Swiss-model
- Domains: InterPro

GPEET2 procyclin precursor

Identifiers
- Organism: Trypanosoma brucei
- Symbol: Tb927.6.510, Tb06.28F21.90
- Entrez: 3657686
- RefSeq (mRNA): XM_840081.1
- RefSeq (Prot): XP_845174.1
- UniProt: Q581F9

Other data
- Chromosome: 6: 0.23 - 0.23 Mb
Search for
- Structures: Swiss-model
- Domains: InterPro

Procyclins also known as procyclic acidic repetitive proteins or PARP are proteins developed in the surface coating of Trypanosoma brucei parasites while in their tsetse fly vector. The cell surface of the bloodstream form features a dense coat of variable surface glycoproteins (VSGs) which is replaced by an equally dense coat of procyclins when the parasite differentiates into the procylic form in the tsetse fly midgut.

There are six or seven procyclin genes that encode unusual proteins with extensive tandem repeat units of glutamic acid (E) and proline (P), referred to as EP repeats (EP1, EP1-2, EP2, EP2-1, EP3, EP3-2, EP3-4), and two genes that encode proteins with internal pentapeptide GPEET repeats (GPEET2).

EP1 is a 141 amino acids protein and EP2 is a 129 AA protein. Both proteins have their coding genes situated on chromosome 10. GPEET2 is a 114 AA protein and EP3-2 is 123 AA protein with genes situated on chromosome 6.

== See also ==
- Coat protein (disambiguation)
