= Coat protein =

Coat protein may refer to:

- Viral coat protein, a component of the capsid
- Variable surface glycoproteins or procyclins, surface coat proteins of either the bloodstream form or the procyclic form of the parasite Trypanosoma brucei
- COPI, a type of vesicle coat protein that transports proteins from the cis end of the Golgi complex back to the rough endoplasmic reticulum
- COPII, a type of vesicle coat protein that transports proteins from the rough endoplasmic reticulum to the Golgi apparatus
