= CD164 =

Protein found in humans

Identifiers
- Aliases: CD164, MGC-24, MUC-24, endolyn, DFNA66, CD164 molecule, MGC-24v
- External IDs: OMIM: 603356; MGI: 1859568; GeneCards: CD164

Gene location (Human)
Chr.	Chromosome 6 (human)
Band	6q21	Start	109,366,514 bp
Band	6q21	End	109,382,467 bp

Gene location (Mouse)
Chr.	Chromosome 10 (mouse)
Band	10 B2|10 22.46 cM	Start	41,395,410 bp
Band	10 B2|10 22.46 cM	End	41,407,044 bp
RNA expression pattern
Bgee	Human / Mouse (ortholog); Top expressed in: mucosa of sigmoid colon; bronchial epithelial cell; kidney tubule; secondary oocyte; skin of hip; lactiferous duct; rectum; epithelium of nasopharynx; glomerulus; skin of thigh / Top expressed in: parotid gland; submandibular gland; epithelium of lens; Epithelium of choroid plexus; iris; retinal pigment epithelium; lacrimal gland; vestibular membrane of cochlear duct; cornea; islet of Langerhans; More reference expression data
BioGPS	n/a
Gene ontology
Molecular function	protein binding
Cellular component	integral component of membrane; extracellular region; lysosomal membrane; endosome; plasma membrane; lysosome; integral component of plasma membrane; endosome membrane; membrane; cytoplasmic vesicle
Biological process	multicellular organism development; negative regulation of cell adhesion; heterophilic cell-cell adhesion via plasma membrane cell adhesion molecules; cell adhesion; muscle organ development; immune response; signal transduction; negative regulation of cell population proliferation; hemopoiesis
Sources:Amigo / QuickGO
Orthologs
Databases	NCBI: entry; OMA: entry
Species	Human	Mouse
Entrez	8763	53599
Ensembl	ENSG00000135535	ENSMUSG00000019818
UniProt	Q04900	Q9R0L9
RefSeq (mRNA)	NM_006016; NM_001142401; NM_001142402; NM_001142403; NM_001142404 NM_001346500	NM_016898
RefSeq (protein)	NP_001135873; NP_001135874; NP_001135875; NP_001135876; NP_001333429 NP_006007	NP_058594
Location (UCSC)	Chr 6: 109.37 – 109.38 Mb	Chr 10: 41.4 – 41.41 Mb
PubMed search
- Wikidata
View/Edit Human	View/Edit Mouse

Sialomucin core protein 24 also known as endolyn or CD164 (cluster of differentiation 164) is a protein that in humans is encoded by the CD164 gene. CD164 functions as a cell adhesion molecule.

Sialomucins are a heterogeneous group of secreted or membrane-associated mucins that appear to play two key but opposing roles in vivo: first as cytoprotective or antiadhesive agents, and second as adhesion receptors. CD164 is a type I integral transmembrane sialomucin that functions as an adhesion receptor.

A genome wide CRISPR/Cas9 screen in human A549 cells identified CD164 as an internal entry receptor for the arenavirus Lymphocytic Choriomeningitis Virus (LCMV).
