= Trifluridine/tipiracil =

Combination medication

Combination of
- Trifluridine: Cytotoxin
- Tipiracil: Thymidine phosphorylase inhibitor

Clinical data
- Trade names: Lonsurf
- Other names: TAS-102
- AHFS/Drugs.com: Monograph
- MedlinePlus: a615049
- Pregnancy category: AU: D
- Routes of administration: By mouth
- ATC code: L01BC59 (WHO)

Legal status
- Legal status: AU: S4 (Prescription only); CA: ℞-only; UK: POM (Prescription only); US: ℞-only; EU: Rx-only

Identifiers
- KEGG: D10526

Trifluridine/tipiracil (FTD–TPI), sold under the brand name Lonsurf, is a fixed-dose combination medication that is used as a third- or fourth-line treatment of metastatic colorectal cancer or gastric cancer, after chemotherapy and targeted therapeutics have failed. It is a combination of two active pharmaceutical ingredients: trifluridine, a nucleoside analog, and tipiracil, a thymidine phosphorylase inhibitor. Tipiracil prevents rapid metabolism of trifluridine, increasing the bioavailability of trifluridine.

The most common side effects include neutropenia (low levels of neutrophils, a type of white blood cell that fights infection), feeling sick, tiredness and anemia (low red blood cell counts).

== Medical uses ==
It is used as a third- or fourth-line treatment for metastatic colorectal cancer or gastric cancer, after chemotherapy and biologic therapy.

== Contraindications ==
The combination caused harm to the fetus of pregnant animals, and it was not tested in pregnant women. Pregnant women should not take it, and women should not become pregnant while taking it.

== Adverse effects ==
The combination severely suppresses bone marrow function, resulting in fewer red blood cells, white blood cells, and platelets, so many people taking it are at risk for infections, anemia, and blood loss from lack of clotting. It also causes digestive problems, with more than 10% of people experiencing loss of appetite, diarrhea, nausea, and vomiting. More than 10% of people experience fatigue and fever.

Between 1 and 10% of people have skin and mucosa issues, like rashes and itchiness, or mouth sores, as well as skin sloughing, numbness, redness, and swelling of their palms and soles. Dizziness and confusion are common as well.

== Interactions ==
Only in vitro interaction studies are available. In these, trifluridine used the concentrative nucleoside transporter 1 (CNT1) and equilibrative nucleoside transporters 1 (ENT1) and 2 (ENT2), and tipiracil was transported by the solute carrier proteins SLC22A2 and SLC47A1. Drugs that interact with these transporters could influence blood plasma concentrations of trifluridine and tipiracil. Trifluridine, being a thymidine phosphorylase inhibitor, could also interact with substrates of this enzyme such as zidovudine.

== Pharmacology ==
=== Mechanism of action ===
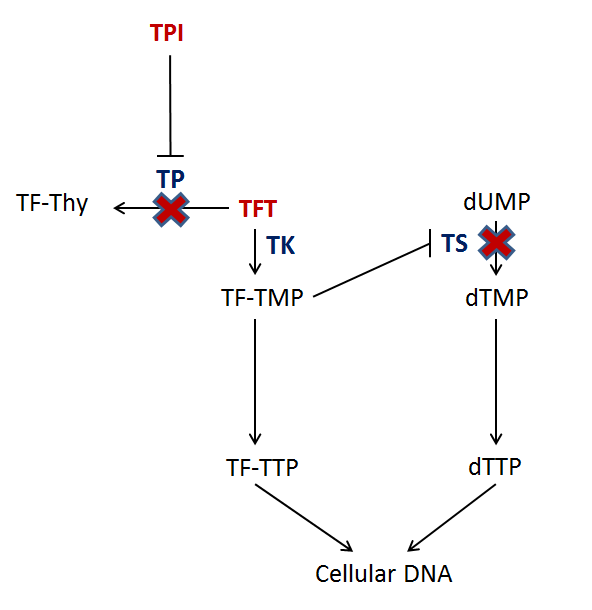
Mechanism of action. Details see text.

The drug consists of the cytotoxin trifluridine and the thymidine phosphorylase inhibitor (TPI) tipiracil. Trifluridine is incorporated into DNA during DNA synthesis and inhibits tumor cell growth. Trifluridine (TFT) is incorporated into DNA by phosphorylation by thymidylate kinase (TK) to TF-TMP; TF-TMP then covalently binds to tyrosine 146 of the active site of thymidylate synthase (TS) inhibiting the enzyme's activity. TS is vital to the synthesis of DNA because it is an enzyme involved in the synthesis of the deoxynucleotide, thymidine triphosphate (dTTP). Inhibition of TS depletes the cell of dTTP and causes accumulation of deoxyuridine monophosphate (dUMP), which increases the likelihood that uracil gets misincorporated into the DNA. Also, subsequent phosphorylations of TF-TMP cause an increased level of TF-TTP within the cell, which results in it being incorporated into DNA. Even though the exact mechanism of how TFT causes DNA damage is not completely understood, it is hypothesized that the incorporation TF-TTP in DNA leads to DNA strand break formation.

Tipiracil prevents the degradation of trifluridine via thymidine phosphorylase (TP) when taken orally and also has antiangiogenic properties.

== History ==
Since the synthesis of 5-fluorouracil (5-FU) in 1957, fluoropyrimidines have been used to treat many types of cancer. Due to the drawbacks of 5-FU therapy, such as having to be administered over long periods of time via intravenous infusion and the development of resistance in tumors, more convenient and efficacious fluoropyrimidine therapy has been desired. The fluoropyrimidine component of this drug, trifluridine, was first synthesized in 1964 by Heidelberger et al.

By the late 1960s, Phase I and Phase II clinical trials of intravenous trifluridine alone initially proved to be disappointing. Its pharmacokinetic profile during these clinical trials showed that the drug exhibited a very short half-life while in serum (12 minutes post-injection). Adjustments in the dosing regimen improved its effects in small studies, but the effect was short-lived.

Researchers later found out that trifluridine, when taken orally, was broken down into the inactive metabolites 5-trifluoromethyluracil and 5-trifluoromethyl-2,4(1H,3,H)-pyrimidinedione (FTY) during its extensive first pass metabolism in the liver via the enzyme thymidine phosphorylase. It was then hypothesized that orally administered FTD concentrations could be increased and maintained if the drug was given with a thymidine phosphorylase inhibitor.

Trifluridine/tipiracil was approved by the US FDA in September 2015, and by the European Medicines Agency in April 2016.
