= Imogen Coe =

British-born biochemist

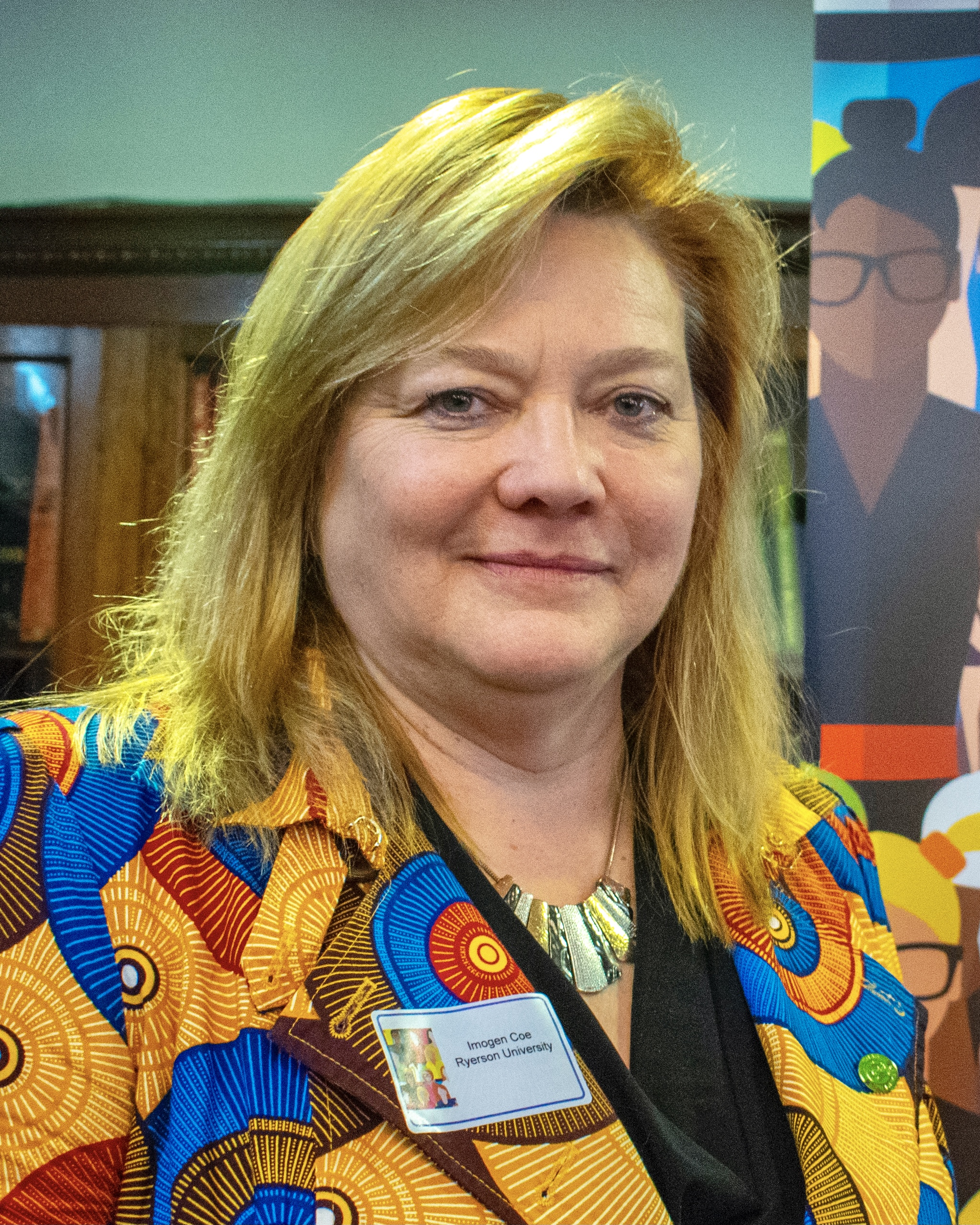
- Born: Imogen Ruth Coe; 30 November 1962 (age 63)
- Education: University of Exeter; University of Victoria
- Known for: Equilibrative nucleoside transporters
- Scientific career
- Workplaces: Toronto Metropolitan University
- Doctoral advisor: Nancy Sherwood
- Website: www.ryerson.ca/coe/

Imogen Ruth Coe (born 30 November 1962) is a British-born biochemist. Educated in the United Kingdom, Canada, and the United States, Coe has taught at York University in Canada. She is a professor of biochemistry and founding dean of the Faculty of Science at Toronto Metropolitan University (previously Ryerson University) in Toronto.

== Early life and education ==
Coe grew up near Cambridge, and attended the Perse School for Girls. She completed her BSc (hons) at the University of Exeter in 1984, and then moved to the University of Victoria for her postgraduate studies. She earned an MSc with George Mackie and a PhD in comparative molecular neuroendocrinology in 1992 under the supervision of Nancy Sherwood. Next, she joined the Ernest Gallo Clinic and Research Centre at the University of California, San Francisco, working as a postdoctoral fellow working on the role of adenosine transporter (membrane transport proteins) with Adrienne Grant and Ivan Diamond. In 1994, she was awarded an Alberta Heritage Foundation for Medical Research Postdoctoral Fellowship to work with Carol Cass in the Department of Biochemistry at the University of Alberta.

== Career ==
In 1997, Coe was recruited to York University in Toronto, Ontario, Canada as an assistant professor. There she established her research lab, which is focused on understanding the structure, function and regulation of nucleoside transporters. In 2005, she was the first woman to chair the Department of Biology, and subsequently promoted to Associate Dean, Research and Partnerships for the Faculty of Science in 2011.

=== Research ===
Coe is recognised around the world for her research on the family of proteins that is important in cellular homeostasis, purinergic signaling and the clinical important uptake of drugs involved in cancer, viral and parasitic infections.

Research interests include understanding the underlying structure of Equilibrative nucleoside transporters (ENTs) and whether novel chemotherapies, such as nucleoside analog drug in combination with ultrasound microbubble treatments, can enhance drug efficacy.

In 1998, she won a Banting Research Foundation Biochem Pharma Award. She won Ontario's Premier's Research Excellence Award in 2000. In 2012, she was recruited to Ryerson University (now Toronto Metropolitan University) as the founding Dean of the newly formed Faculty of Science. At Toronto Metropolitan University, she is appointed within the Department of Chemistry and Biology and is also an affiliate scientist in the Li Ka Shing Knowledge Institute, Keenan Research Centre at St. Michael's Hospital.

Coe is a member of the board of directors of the Michael Garron Hospital. She is also a member of the Canadian Mining Innovation Council.

=== Public engagement and science advocacy ===
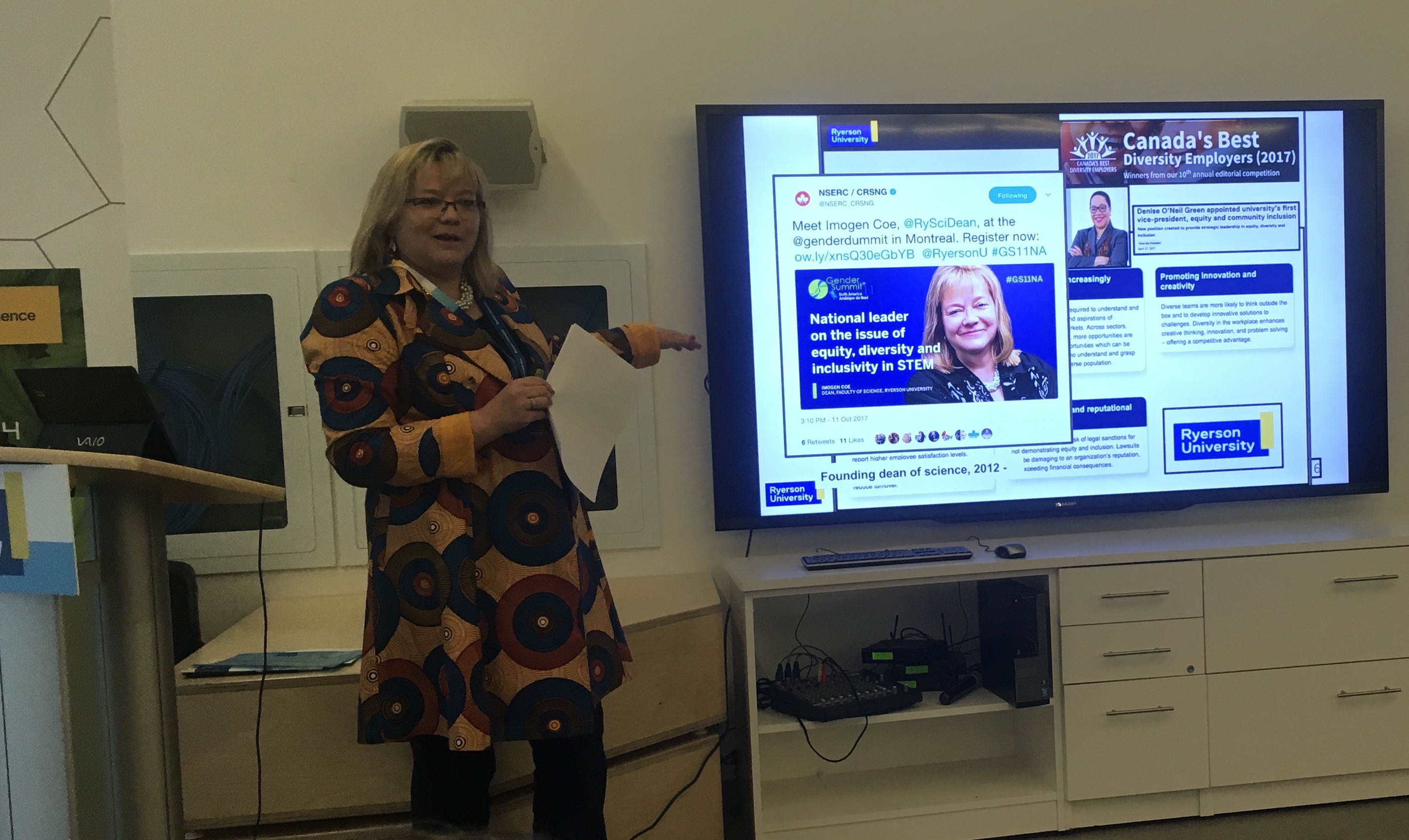
Ryerson University Dean of Science, Professor Imogen Coe

Coe is known in Canada, and internationally, for her advocacy in support of equity, diversity and inclusion in STEM, particularly within education. Coe has contributed to HuffPost, The Globe and Mail and Womanthology. In 2016, Coe delivered a TEDx talk at Ryerson University "Change the Numbers: Equity, Diversity, and Inclusivity in STEM". She is a vocal supporter of gender equity in STEM. Coe is focussed on challenging gender stereotypes, increasing accessibility and promoting representation and inclusion for all members of under-represented groups. She was recognised as one of Canada's Top 100 Most Powerful Women in the TrailBlazer category by Women's Executive Network in 2016.

Coe is on the advisory board of non-profit hErVOLUTION, a group developing education and employment for young women in STEM, and the Executive Advisory Council of FIRST Robotics Canada. She is one of the spokespersons for ScienceUpFirst, a science communication initiative aiming at reducing the impact of COVID-19 misinformation online.

While Ryerson University's Dean of Science (2012–2018), Coe gave many conference keynotes and plenaries, as well as giving university lectures and speaking at workshops. On 26 October 2015, she delivered the inaugural International Ada Lovelace Day Lecture at York University, Toronto. In May 2017, Coe brought Soapbox Science to North America for the first time.

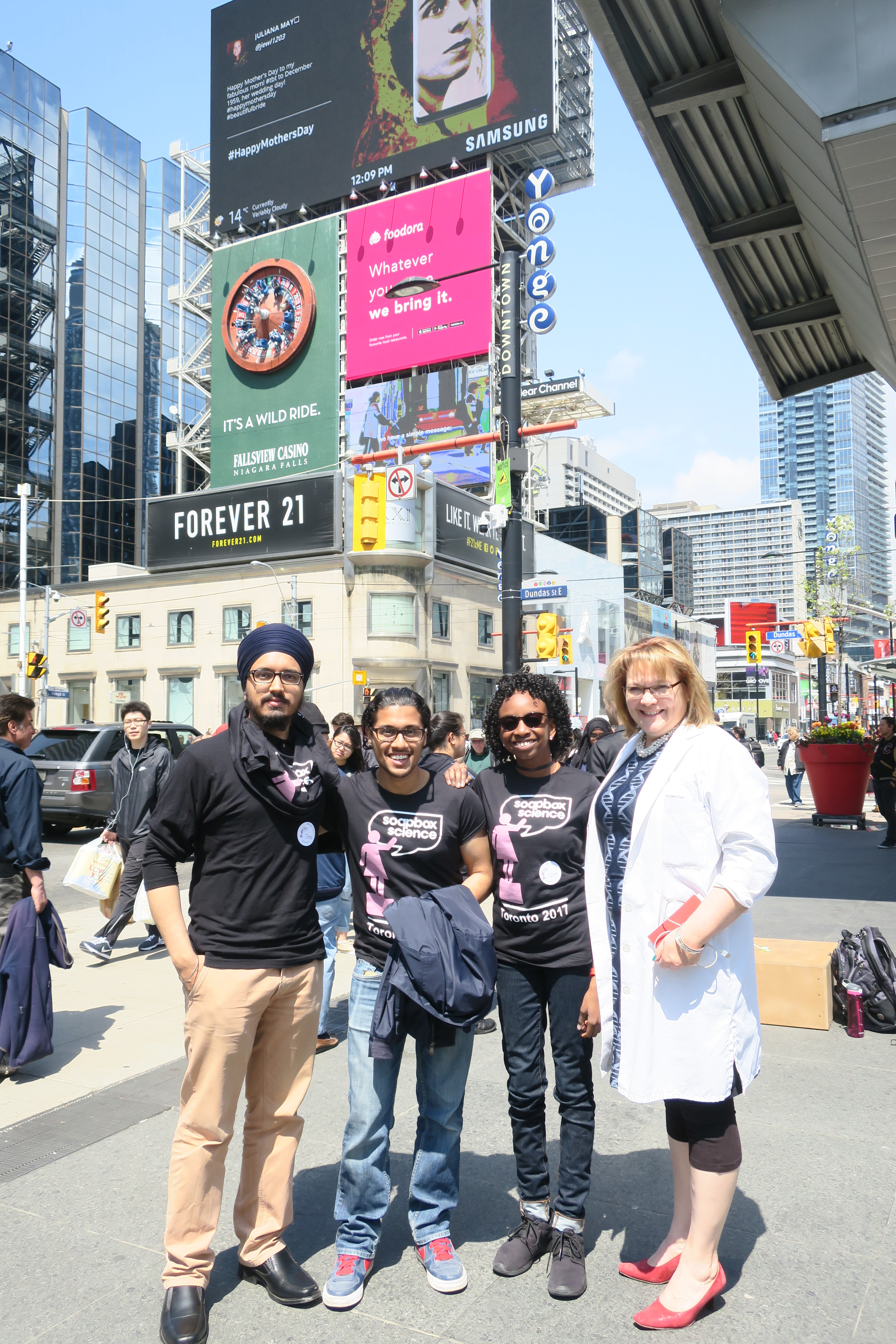
Imogen Coe at Soapbox Science Toronto May 2017

She was a keynote speaker at the 2017 Canadian Conference for Undergraduate Women in Physics.
