= Pyrimidine-deoxynucleoside 1'-dioxygenase =

Identifiers
- EC no.: 1.14.11.10
- CAS no.: 98865-52-2

Databases
- IntEnz: IntEnz view
- BRENDA: BRENDA entry
- ExPASy: NiceZyme view
- KEGG: KEGG entry
- MetaCyc: metabolic pathway
- PRIAM: profile
- PDB structures: RCSB PDB PDBe PDBsum
- Gene Ontology: AmiGO / QuickGO
Search
- PMC: articles
- PubMed: articles
- NCBI: proteins

Pyrimidine-deoxynucleoside 1'-dioxygenase from Rhodotorula glutinis (EC 1.14.11.10) is an enzyme that catalyzes the chemical reaction

deoxyuridine
+ 2-oxoglutaric
acid
O_{2}
CO_{2}
2-deoxyribonolactone
+
uracil
+ succinic
acid

The three substrates of this enzyme are deoxyuridine, 2-oxoglutaric acid, and oxygen. Its products are 2-deoxyribonolactone, uracil, succinic acid, and carbon dioxide.

This enzyme is an alpha-ketoglutarate-dependent hydroxylase with systematic name 2'-deoxyuridine,2-oxoglutarate:oxygen oxidoreductase (1'-hydroxylating). It is also called deoxyuridine-uridine 1'-dioxygenase. It has 2 cofactors: iron, and ascorbic acid.

Pyrimidine-deoxynucleoside 2'-dioxygenase is a related enzyme which converts deoxyuridine to uridine instead of cleaving the uracil portion.
