= FTY =

FTY may refer to:

- Fulton County Airport (Georgia), United States, IATA airport code FTY
- 5-trifluoromethyl-2,4(1H,3H)-pyrimidinedione, the main metabolite of the pharmaceutical drug trifluridine
