= Equilibrative nucleoside transporter 3 =

Protein found in humans

SLC29A3

Identifiers
- Aliases: SLC29A3, ENT3, HCLAP, HJCD, PHID, solute carrier family 29 member 3
- External IDs: OMIM: 612373; MGI: 1918529; GeneCards: SLC29A3

Gene location (Human)
Chr.	Chromosome 10 (human)
Band	10q22.1	Start	71,319,259 bp
Band	10q22.1	End	71,381,423 bp

Gene location (Mouse)
Chr.	Chromosome 10 (mouse)
Band	10|10 B4	Start	60,547,851 bp
Band	10|10 B4	End	60,588,573 bp
RNA expression pattern
Bgee	Human / Mouse (ortholog); Top expressed in: gonad; mucosa of urinary bladder; placenta; oocyte; right ovary; granulocyte; testicle; mononuclear cell; monocyte; left ovary / Top expressed in: right kidney; proximal tubule; human kidney; stroma of bone marrow; lumbar subsegment of spinal cord; lacrimal gland; external carotid artery; internal carotid artery; lymph node; granulocyte; More reference expression data
BioGPS	n/a
Gene ontology
Molecular function	nucleoside transmembrane transporter activity; protein binding
Cellular component	integral component of membrane; lysosomal membrane; endosome; lysosome; membrane; late endosome membrane; Golgi apparatus; intracellular membrane-bounded organelle; plasma membrane
Biological process	nucleoside transport; nucleoside transmembrane transport; transport
Sources:Amigo / QuickGO
Orthologs
Databases	NCBI: entry; OMA: entry
Species	Human	Mouse
Entrez	55315	71279
Ensembl	ENSG00000198246	ENSMUSG00000020100
UniProt	Q9BZD2	Q99P65
RefSeq (mRNA)	NM_001174098; NM_018344; NM_001363518	NM_023596
RefSeq (protein)	NP_001167569; NP_060814; NP_001350447	NP_076085
Location (UCSC)	Chr 10: 71.32 – 71.38 Mb	Chr 10: 60.55 – 60.59 Mb
PubMed search
- Wikidata
View/Edit Human	View/Edit Mouse

Equilibrative nucleoside transporter 3 (ENT3) is a protein that in humans is encoded by the gene SLC29A3. As a equilibrative nucleoside transporter, this protein functions to transport nucleosides and similar molecules, with ENT3 specifically transporting across the membranes of the lysosomes and mitochondria. This protein plays multiple important roles including regulating macrophages, participates in urate disposal, and it may also play a part in nucleic acid salvage pathways.

== Function ==
This protein is a uniporter which is capable of transporting a wide variety of molecules, including many nucleosides, deoxynucleosides, nucleobases, ATP, urate, and monoamine neurotransmitters. Unlike its relatives ENT1 (SLC29A1) and ENT2 (SLC29A2) which are primarily found in the cell membrane, ENT3 has only been found their in specific placental cells outside of disease states. Instead, ENT3 is primarily located in membranes of the lysosomes, mitochondria, and (late) endosomes, and its activity is enhanced by low pH.

The role of ENT3 hasn't been as well characterized as ENT1 and ENT2, but it seems to play a role in a number of different pathways.

- It can also export urate out of the lysomes, playing a part in (intracellular) disposal, and regulating inflammasome protein activation.
- By transporting nucleosides from the lysosomes to the cytosol and the cytosol to the mitochondria, ENT3 may help facilitate nucleic acid salvage.
- By exporting nucleosides out of the lysosomes of macrophages, it may play a role in regulating macrophage proliferation and behavior.

Knock-out mice display an excessive numbers of macrophages in their tissue (histiocytosis), and a build-up of nucleosides in the lysosomes. By age 8 weeks, their lymph nodes and spleens grew abnormally large, and they died younger than their littermates.

== Medical Significance ==
Pathogenic mutations in SLC29A3 have been associated with a number of disorders involving dysfunctional tissue macrophages (histiocytosis) that were previous thought to be distinct, now designated under the umbrella term histiocytosis-lymphadenopathy plus syndrome. This is inherited in an autosomal recessive manner, and its most consistent signs across subtypes are histologic features.
