= Concentrative nucleoside transporter 2 =

Protein found in humans

SLC28A2

Identifiers
- Aliases: SLC28A2, CNT2, HCNT2, HsT17153, SPNT1, Concentrative nucleoside transporter 2, solute carrier family 28 member 2
- External IDs: OMIM: 606208; MGI: 1913105; GeneCards: SLC28A2

Gene location (Human)
Chr.	Chromosome 15 (human)
Band	15q21.1	Start	45,252,234 bp
Band	15q21.1	End	45,277,846 bp

Gene location (Mouse)
Chr.	Chromosome 2 (mouse)
Band	2|2 E5	Start	122,426,477 bp
Band	2|2 E5	End	122,461,137 bp
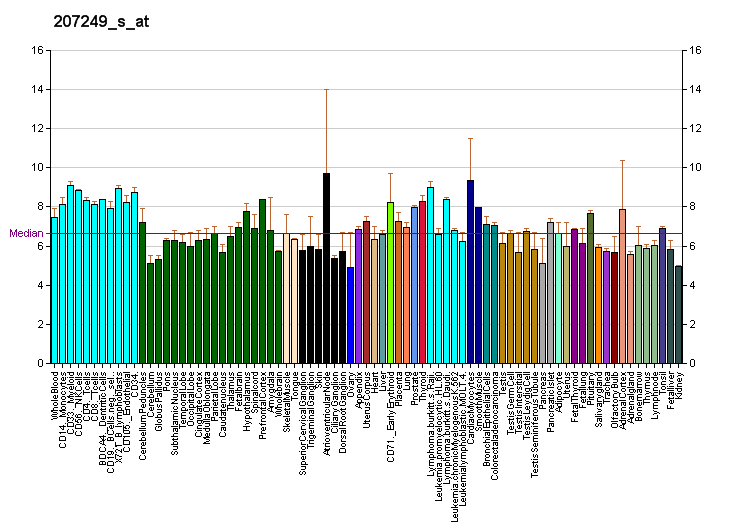
RNA expression pattern
Bgee	Human / Mouse (ortholog); Top expressed in: jejunal mucosa; mucosa of ileum; duodenum; rectum; buccal mucosa cell; gallbladder; mucosa of sigmoid colon; testicle; mucosa of transverse colon; olfactory zone of nasal mucosa / Top expressed in: jejunum; duodenum; ileum; granulocyte; spleen; thymus; quadriceps femoris muscle; colon; muscle tissue; yolk sac; More reference expression data
BioGPS	More reference expression data
Gene ontology
Molecular function	purine nucleoside transmembrane transporter activity; nucleoside transmembrane transporter activity; nucleoside:sodium symporter activity
Cellular component	integral component of membrane; plasma membrane; membrane; integral component of plasma membrane
Biological process	purine nucleoside transmembrane transport; nucleoside transmembrane transport; nucleobase-containing compound metabolic process
Sources:Amigo / QuickGO
Orthologs
Databases	NCBI: entry; OMA: entry
Species	Human	Mouse
Entrez	9153	269346
Ensembl	ENSG00000137860	ENSMUSG00000027219
UniProt	O43868	O88627
RefSeq (mRNA)	NM_004212	NM_172980; NM_001356532
RefSeq (protein)	NP_004203	NP_766568; NP_001343461; NP_001366388; NP_001366389
Location (UCSC)	Chr 15: 45.25 – 45.28 Mb	Chr 2: 122.43 – 122.46 Mb
PubMed search
- Wikidata
View/Edit Human	View/Edit Mouse

Concentrative nucleoside transporter 2 (CNT2) is a protein that in humans is encoded by the SLC28A2 gene.

== See also ==
- Concentrative nucleoside transporters
- Nucleoside transporters
- Solute carrier family
