= Nathalie Pettorelli =

Conservation biologist

Nathalie Pettorelli OBE
- Born: 1976 (age 49–50)
- Alma mater: University of Lyon; University of Strasbourg
- Scientific career
- Workplaces: Institute of Zoology; University of Oslo
- Thesis: Variabilité individuelle et dynamique de population : importance de la composante spatiale (2002)

Nathalie Pettorelli (born 1976) is a French conservation biologist who is a professor at the Institute of Zoology. Her research looks to inform environmental and wildlife management. She co-founded Soapbox Science in 2011, and was appointed an Officer of the Order of the British Empire in 2024.

== Early life and education ==
Pettorelli grew up in France and attended Pontonniers International High School. She studied biology at the University of Strasbourg, and eventually moved into ecology during her graduate studies in Paris. Her doctoral research at the University of Lyon considered population dynamics. She investigated the quality of roe deer habitats in South West France. After graduating, she moved to the University of Oslo, where she investigated how climate was impacting vegetation and the dynamics of deer populations. She started to use remote sensing, using data collected from aircraft or satellites to study wildlife. She moved to Université Laval to study ungulates, and eventually to the Zoological Society of London to better understand cheetah dynamics.

== Research and career ==
Pettorelli is a conservation biologist at the Institute of Zoology. She has worked in the Serengeti National Park and Chad. She aims to better understand the processes that drive the loss of biological diversity, and to use satellite data to inform policymaking. Her research has described the dynamics of vegetation in game reserves, and whether it was possible to reintroduce Scimitar oryx.

Alongside her research, Pettorelli is involved with science communication and outreach. Together with Seirian Sumner she launched Soapbox Science, which gives women scientists the opportunity to share their research and stories with the public.

== Awards and honours ==
- 2010 L'Oréal-UNESCO For Women in Science Award
- 2015 Point of Light Award
- 2024 The ENDS Report Power List
- 2024 Appointed Officer of the Order of the British Empire
- 2025 Elected a Fellow of the British Ecological Society

== Selected publications ==
- Nathalie Pettorelli; Jon Olav Vik; Atle Mysterud; Jean-Michel Gaillard; Compton J Tucker; Nils Chr Stenseth (2005). "Using the satellite-derived NDVI to assess ecological responses to environmental change". Trends in Ecology & Evolution. 20 (9): 503–510. doi:10.1016/j.tree.2005.05.011. PMID 16701427. Wikidata Q33243477.
- Gretta T. Pecl; Miguel Bastos Araújo; Johann D Bell; et al. (2017). "Biodiversity redistribution under climate change: Impacts on ecosystems and human well-being". Science. 355 (6332). doi:10.1126/science.aai9214. PMID 28360268. Wikidata Q30061758.
- N Pettorelli; S Ryan; T Mueller; N Bunnefeld; B Jedrzejewska; M Lima; K Kausrud (2011). "The Normalized Difference Vegetation Index (NDVI): unforeseen successes in animal ecology". Climate Research. 46 (1): 15–27. doi:10.3354/cr00936. Wikidata Q56445062.
