= Banting Research Foundation =

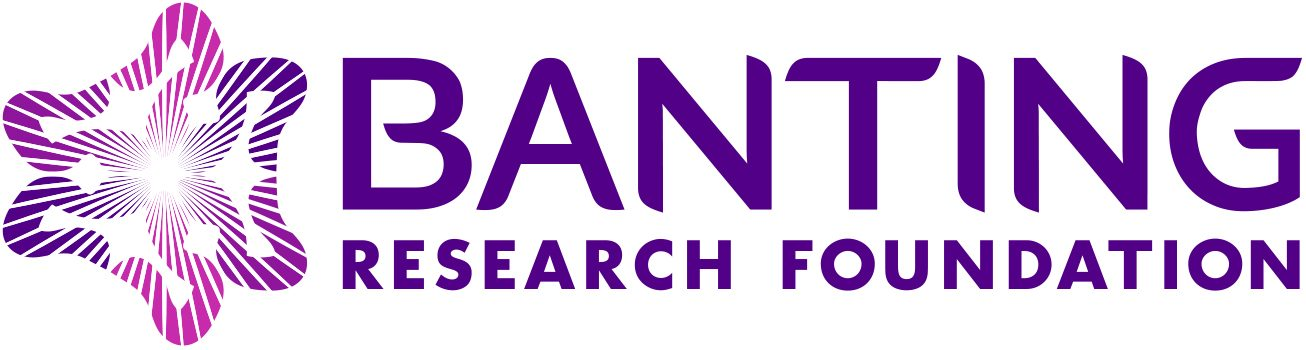
- Named after: Frederick G. Banting
- Formation: July 22, 1925
- Type: Public Foundation
- Website: www.bantingdiscoveryfoundation.ca

The Banting Research Foundation is a registered charity whose object was to fund health and biomedical research in Canada. It was established in honor of Frederick Banting. In 2025, on its 100th anniversary, it re-branded as the Banting Discovery Foundation.

== History ==
The Banting Research Foundation was created in 1925 to commemorate the discovery of insulin and to support further medical research by Frederick G. Banting and other scientists in Canada, hoping to find additional medical discoveries of equal importance. A fundraising campaign in 1925, led by Sir William Mulock, Chancellor of the University of Toronto, raised $500,000 from individual and corporate donors to establish an endowment. A large bequest in 1948 from the estate of Kate E Taylor of Toronto was added to the endowment.

From its inception, the intent was to create a fund for researchers with "good ideas but no money", as was the situation for Banting when he approached JJR Macleod in 1921 with a request for facilities and resources to pursue his ideas about insulin. The Foundation implements this mandate by providing grant funds specifically to early-career health and biomedical researchers with limited funding. The Foundation was the first and only organization funding medical research in Canada until 1938 when the National Research Council included medical research in its funding programs.

=== Notable grant recipients ===
- Frederick Banting
- Charles Best
- Wilfred Gordon Bigelow
- Bruce Chown
- Michel Chrétien
- Adolfo J. de Bold
- John Dirks
- Wilbur R. Franks
- Clarke Fraser
- Henry Friesen
- Arthur Ham
- Charles Hollenberg
- Charles Philippe Leblond
- D. W. Gordon Murray
- William Thornton Mustard
- Janet Rossant
- Louis Siminovitch
- Brenda Gallie
- Imogen Coe
- Rose Johnstone

== Governance ==
The Foundation is incorporated in the province of Ontario, Canada. It is governed by a Board of Trustees, the make-up of which is specified in its Letters Patent as follows: three Trustees appointed by the Governing Council of the University of Toronto, two Trustees appointed by the University of Toronto Alumni Association, two Trustees appointed from the University of Toronto's Faculty of Medicine, and one Trustee appointed by the other Trustees.

The original Board of Trustees in 1925 was composed of Sir Robert Falconer, chairman, Lt Col Reuben W Leonard, Rev Canon Henry J Cody, Charles Strange MacDonald, William Edward Gallie, John Gerald FitzGerald, Velyien Ewart Henderson, and John William Rogers.
