= Siwan Davies =

Welsh academic

Professor Siwan Davies
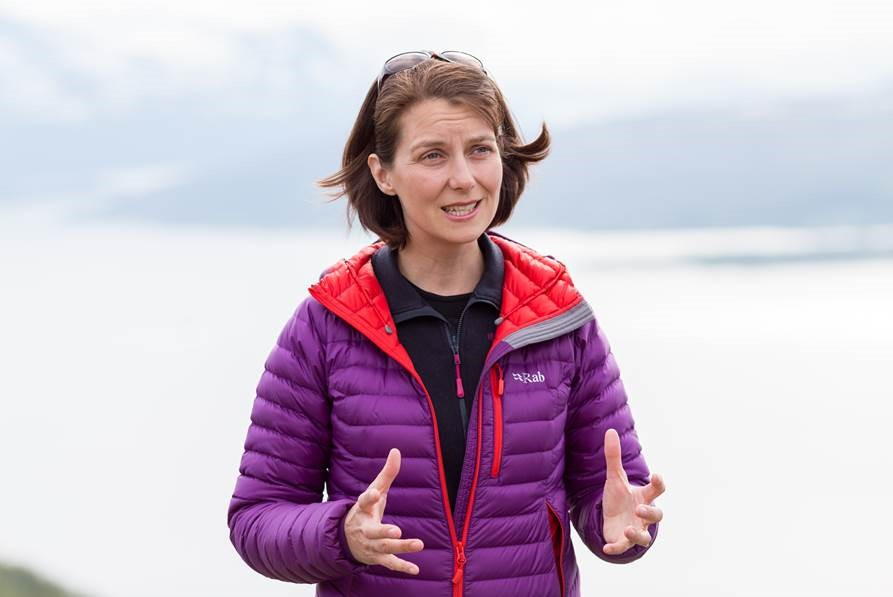
- Born: Newport, Pembrokeshire, Wales
- Education: Royal Holloway, University of London
- Writing career
- Language: Welsh, English
- Genre: Academic
- Subject: Geography

Siwan Davies FLSW is a Welsh professor of Physical Geography in the department of science at Swansea University.

== Research ==
Davies' research focus is to analyze past climate change and to reconstruct past climate changes. Together with a team of lecturing staff, technicians, PhD students and post doctoral researchers Davies is looking at rapid climatic changes. One of the challenges to understand why these changes occur is understanding where these events happen, are there triggers in the oceans or are there triggers in the atmosphere? By analyzing ash layers that have been spread across and therefore incorporated into ice and terrestrial matter from erupted volcanoes. By analyzing the microscopic ash particles in these matters Davies and her team can measure differences and similarities in changes that have occurred. These findings help to date and explain when these changes happened and why. By understanding what happened in the past will give them insight into what may happen in the future. Davies and her team are working closely with the ice and climate group at the University of Copenhagen as well as UK institutions such as Bangor and the University of Saint Andrews.

Davies is currently working in collaboration with scientists from 14 different countries to excavate ice from the northwest of Greenland as part of the North Greenland Eemian Ice Drilling (Neem) project. The ice will be retrieved in layers as far down as 8,000ft. The findings within this excavation will include evidence of organic materials as well as air bubbles that will be an indication of greenhouse gases that could have been found in the atmosphere over 100,000 years ago. Davies research on minuscule ash particles within the layers of ice, will help create a timeline of volcanic eruptions, which will help compare and analyze climatic evidence recorded in the Greenland ice with that preserved in the deep sea.

S4C filmed a series Her yr Hinsawdd documenting Davies experience in meeting communities in Greenland and the Maldives affected by climate changes and in particular the ice caps melting.

Siwan Davies is also an advocate for promoting women in STEM, speaking at events like soapbox science in Swansea, 2014. She is a founding committee member of Swansea Science Grll and SwanStemWomen.

== Career history ==
Career history
Year from	Year to	Position	Organisation
2016	2016	President of Geography section	British Science Association
2015	Present	Elected Fellow	Learned Society for Wales
2012	Present	Professor of Physical Geography	Swansea University
2011	2012	Reader	Swansea University
2008	2011	Senior Lecturer	Swansea University
2004	2008	Lecturer	Swansea University
2003	2004	Post-doctoral research assistant	University of Copenhagen
2002	2003	Post-doctoral research assistant	Stockholm University

== Publications ==
=== Journal articles ===
1. Fogwill C, Turney C, Golledge N, Etheridge D, Rubino M, Thornton D, Baker A, Woodward J, Winter K, Van Ommen T, Moy A, Curran M, Davies S, Weber M, Bird M, Munksgaard N, Menviel L, Rootes C, Ellis B, et al. (2017). "Antarctic ice sheet discharge driven by atmosphere-ocean feedbacks at the Last Glacial Termination". Scientific Reports. 7 39979. Bibcode:2017NatSR...739979F. doi:10.1038/srep39979. PMC 5215443. PMID 28054598.
2. Jones G, Davies S, Farr G, Bevan J (2017). "Identification of the Askja-S Tephra in a rare turlough record from Pant-y-Llyn, south Wales". Proceedings of the Geologists' Association. 128 (4): 523–530. Bibcode:2017PrGA..128..523J. doi:10.1016/j.pgeola.2017.05.010. S2CID 134265672 – via swan.ac.uk.
3. Jones G, Lane C, Brauer A, Davies S, de Bruijn R, Engels S, Haliuc A, Hoek W, Merkt J, Sachse D, Turner F, Wagner-Cremer F (2017). "The Lateglacial to early Holocene tephrochronological record from Lake Hämelsee, Germany: a key site within the European tephra framework". Boreas. 47: 28–40. doi:10.1111/bor.12250. S2CID 132996483 – via swan.ac.uk.
4. Smedley R, Scourse J, Small D, Hiemstra J, Duller G, Bateman M, Burke M, Chiverrell R, Clark C, Davies S, Fabel D, Gheorghiu D, Mccarroll D, Medialdea A, Xu S (2017). "New age constraints for the limit of the British-Irish Ice Sheet on the Isles of Scilly". Journal of Quaternary Science. 32 (1): 48–62. Bibcode:2017JQS....32...48S. doi:10.1002/jqs.2922. hdl:10871/26360 – via swan.ac.uk.
5. Abbott P, Bourne A, Purcell C, Davies S, Scourse J, Pearce N (2016). "Last glacial period cryptotephra deposits in an eastern North Atlantic marine sequence: Exploring linkages to the Greenland ice-cores". Quaternary Geochronology. 31: 62–76. Bibcode:2016QuGeo..31...62A. doi:10.1016/j.quageo.2015.11.001. S2CID 25572293 – via swan.ac.uk.
6. Bourne A, Abbott P, Albert P, Cook E, Pearce N, Ponomareva V, Svensson A, Davies S (2016). "Underestimated risks of recurrent long-range ash dispersal from northern Pacific Arc volcanoes". Scientific Reports. 6 29837. Bibcode:2016NatSR...629837B. doi:10.1038/srep29837. PMC 4956762. PMID 27445233.
7. Holmes N, Langdon P, Caseldine C, Wastegard S, Leng M, Croudace I, Davies S (2016). "Climatic variability during the last millennium in Western Iceland from lake sediment records". The Holocene. 26 (5): 756–771. Bibcode:2016Holoc..26..756H. doi:10.1177/0959683615618260. S2CID 130820806 – via swan.ac.uk.
8. Macleod A, Davies S (2016). "Caution in cryptotephra correlation: resolving Lateglacial chemical controversies at Sluggan Bog, Northern Ireland". Journal of Quaternary Science. 31 (4): 406–415. Bibcode:2016JQS....31..406M. doi:10.1002/jqs.2858. S2CID 21481322 – via swan.ac.uk.
9. Zawalna-Geer A, Lindsay J, Davies S, Augustinus P, Davies S (2016). "Extracting a primary Holocene crytoptephra record from Pupuke maar sediments, Auckland, New Zealand". Journal of Quaternary Science. 31 (5): 442–457. Bibcode:2016JQS....31..442Z. doi:10.1002/jqs.2866. S2CID 132636994 – via swan.ac.uk.
10. Bourne A, Cook E, Abbott P, Seierstad I, Steffensen J, Svensson A, Fischer H, Schüpbach S, Davies S (2015). "A tephra lattice for Greenland and a reconstruction of volcanic events spanning 25–45 ka b2k". Quaternary Science Reviews. 118: 122–141. Bibcode:2015QSRv..118..122B. doi:10.1016/j.quascirev.2014.07.017 – via swan.ac.uk.
11. Davies S (2015). "Cryptotephras: the revolution in correlation and precision dating". Journal of Quaternary Science. 30 (2): 114–130. Bibcode:2015JQS....30..114D. doi:10.1002/jqs.2766. PMC 4959123. PMID 27512240 – via swan.ac.uk.
12. Griggs A, Davies S, Abbott P, Coleman M, Palmer A, Rasmussen T, Johnston R (2015). "Visualizing tephra deposits and sedimentary processes in the marine environment: The potential of X-ray microtomography". Geochemistry, Geophysics, Geosystems. 16 (12): 4329–4343. Bibcode:2015GGG....16.4329G. doi:10.1002/2015GC006073. PMC 4951705. PMID 27478414 – via swan.ac.uk.
13. Ponomareva V, Portnyagin M, Davies S (2015). "Tephra without Borders: Far-Reaching Clues into Past Explosive Eruptions". Frontiers in Earth Science. 3: 83. Bibcode:2015FrEaS...3...83P. doi:10.3389/feart.2015.00083 – via swan.ac.uk.
14. Abbott P, Austin W, Davies S, Pearce N, Rasmussen T, Wastegård S, Brendryen J (2014). "Re-evaluation and extension of the Marine Isotope Stage 5 tephrostratigraphy of the Faroe Islands region: The cryptotephra record". Palaeogeography, Palaeoclimatology, Palaeoecology. 409: 153–168. Bibcode:2014PPP...409..153A. doi:10.1016/j.palaeo.2014.05.004. hdl:10037/7332 – via swan.ac.uk.
15. Austin W, Abbott P, Davies S, Pearce N, Wastegard S (2014). "Marine tephrochronology: an introduction to tracing time in the ocean". Geological Society, London, Special Publications. 398 (1): 1–5. Bibcode:2014GSLSP.398....1A. doi:10.1144/SP398.12. S2CID 128992489 – via swan.ac.uk.
16. Blockley S, Bourne A, Brauer A, Davies S, Hardiman M, Harding P, Lane C, Macleod A, Matthews I, Pyne-O'Donnell S, Rasmussen S, Wulf S, Zanchetta G (2014). "Tephrochronology and the extended intimate (integration of ice-core, marine and terrestrial records) event stratigraphy 8–128 ka b2k". Quaternary Science Reviews. 106: 88–100. Bibcode:2014QSRv..106...88B. doi:10.1016/j.quascirev.2014.11.002 – via swan.ac.uk.
17. Davies S, Abbott P, Meara R, Pearce N, Austin W, Chapman M, Svensson A, Bigler M, Rasmussen T, Rasmussen S, Farmer E (2014). "A North Atlantic tephrostratigraphical framework for 130–60 ka b2k: new tephra discoveries, marine-based correlations, and future challenges". Quaternary Science Reviews. 106: 101–121. Bibcode:2014QSRv..106..101D. doi:10.1016/j.quascirev.2014.03.024. hdl:10037/7594 – via swan.ac.uk.
18. Griggs A, Davies S, Abbott P, Rasmussen T, Palmer A (2014). "Optimising the use of marine tephrochronology in the North Atlantic: a detailed investigation of the Faroe Marine Ash Zones II, III and IV". Quaternary Science Reviews. 106: 122–139. Bibcode:2014QSRv..106..122G. doi:10.1016/j.quascirev.2014.04.031. hdl:10037/7595 – via swan.ac.uk.
19. Seierstad I, Abbott P, Bigler M, Blunier T, Bourne A, Brook E, Buchardt S, Buizert C, Clausen H, Cook E, Dahl-Jensen D, Davies S, Guillevic M, Johnsen S, Pedersen D, Popp T, Rasmussen S, Severinghaus J, Svensson A, et al. (2014). "Consistently dated records from the Greenland GRIP, GISP2 and NGRIP ice cores for the past 104 ka reveal regional millennial-scale δ18O gradients with possible Heinrich event imprint". Quaternary Science Reviews. 106: 29–46. Bibcode:2014QSRv..106...29S. doi:10.1016/j.quascirev.2014.10.032 – via swan.ac.uk.
20. Abbott P, Austin W, Davies S, Pearce N, Hibbert F (2013). "Cryptotephrochronology of the Eemian and the last interglacial-glacial transition in the North East Atlantic". Journal of Quaternary Science. 28 (5): 501–514. Bibcode:2013JQS....28..501A. doi:10.1002/jqs.2641 – via swan.ac.uk.
21. Bourne A, Davies S, Abbott P, Rasmussen S, Steffensen J, Svensson A (2013). "Revisiting the Faroe Marine Ash Zone III in two Greenland ice cores: implications for marine-ice correlations". Journal of Quaternary Science. 28 (7): 641–646. Bibcode:2013JQS....28..641B. doi:10.1002/jqs.2663. S2CID 131690749 – via swan.ac.uk.
22. Dahl-Jensen D, Albert M, Aldahan A, Azuma N, Balslev-Clausen D, Baumgartner M, Berggren A, Bigler M, Binder T, Blunier T, Bourgeois J, Brook E, Buchardt S, Buizert C, Capron E, Chappellaz J, Chung J, Clausen H, Cvijanovic I, Davies S, Ditlevsen P, Eicher O, Fischer H, Fisher D, Fleet L, Gfeller G, Gkinis V, Gogineni S, Goto-Azuma K (2013). "Eemian interglacial reconstructed from a Greenland folded ice core". Nature. 493 (7433): 489–494. Bibcode:2013Natur.493..489N. doi:10.1038/nature11789. hdl:21.11116/0000-0006-BC16-E. PMID 23344358. S2CID 4420908 – via swan.ac.uk.
23. Rasmussen S, Abbott P, Blunier T, Bourne A, Brook E, Buchardt S, Buizert C, Chappellaz J, Clausen H, Cook E, Dahl-Jensen D, Davies S, Guillevic M, Kipfstuhl S, Laepple T, Seierstad I, Severinghaus J, Steffensen J, Stowasser C, Svensson A, Vallelonga P, Vinther B, Wilhelms F, Winstrup M (2013). "A first chronology for the North Greenland Eemian Ice Drilling (NEEM) ice core". Climate of the Past. 9 (6): 2713–2730. Bibcode:2013CliPa...9.2713R. doi:10.5194/cp-9-2713-2013 – via swan.ac.uk.
24. Abbott P, Davies S (2012). "Volcanism and the Greenland ice-cores: the tephra record". Earth-Science Reviews. 115 (3): 173–191. Bibcode:2012ESRv..115..173A. doi:10.1016/j.earscirev.2012.09.001 – via swan.ac.uk.
25. Abbott P, Davies S, Steffensen J, Pearce N, Bigler M, Johnsen S, Seierstad I, Svensson A, Wastegård S (2012). "A detailed framework of Marine Isotope Stages 4 and 5 volcanic events recorded in two Greenland ice-cores". Quaternary Science Reviews. 36: 59–77. Bibcode:2012QSRv...36...59A. doi:10.1016/j.quascirev.2011.05.001. hdl:2160/8646 – via swan.ac.uk.
26. Davies S, Abbott P, Pearce N, Wastegård S, Blockley S (2012). "Integrating the INTIMATE records using tephrochronology: rising to the challenge". Quaternary Science Reviews. 36: 11–27. Bibcode:2012QSRv...36...11D. doi:10.1016/j.quascirev.2011.04.005. hdl:2160/8645 – via swan.ac.uk.
27. Walker M, Lowe J, Blockley S, Bryant C, Coombes P, Davies S, Hardiman M, Turney C, Watson J (2012). "Lateglacial and early Holocene palaeoenvironmental 'events' in Sluggan Bog, Northern Ireland: comparisons with the Greenland NGRIP GICC05 event stratigraphy". Quaternary Science Reviews. 36: 124–138. Bibcode:2012QSRv...36..124W. doi:10.1016/j.quascirev.2011.09.008 – via swan.ac.uk.
28. Abbott P, Davies S, Austin W, Pearce N, Hibbert F (2011). "Identification of cryptotephra horizons in a North East Atlantic marine record spanning marine isotope stages 4 and 5a (~60,000–82,000 a b2k)". Quaternary International. 246 (1–2): 177–189. Bibcode:2011QuInt.246..177A. doi:10.1016/j.quaint.2011.07.033. hdl:2160/36239 – via swan.ac.uk.
29. Cage A, Davies S, Wastegård S, Austin W (2011). "Identification of the Icelandic Landnám tephra (AD 871 ± 2) in Scottish fjordic sediment". Quaternary International. 246 (1–2): 168–176. Bibcode:2011QuInt.246..168C. doi:10.1016/j.quaint.2011.08.016 – via swan.ac.uk.
30. Lowe D, Davies S, Moriwaki H, Pearce N, Suzuki T (2011). "Enhancing tephrochronology and its application (INTREPID project) : Hiroshi Machida commemorative volume". Quaternary International. 246 (1–2): 5. Bibcode:2011QuInt.246....1L. doi:10.1016/j.quaint.2011.08.012 – via swan.ac.uk.
31. Coulter S, Pilcher J, Hall V, Plunkett G, Davies S (2010). "Testing the reliability of the JEOL FEGSEM 6500F electron microprobe for quantitative major element analysis of glass shards from rhyolitic tephra". Boreas. 39 (1): 163–169. doi:10.1111/j.1502-3885.2009.00113.x. S2CID 130043024 – via swan.ac.uk.
32. Davies S, Larsen G, Wastegård S, Turney C, Hall V, Coyle L, Thordarson T (2010). "Widespread dispersal of Icelandic tephra: how does the Eyjafjöll eruption of 2010 compare to past Icelandic events?". Journal of Quaternary Science. 25 (5): 605–611. Bibcode:2010JQS....25..605D. doi:10.1002/jqs.1421. S2CID 140191338 – via swan.ac.uk.
33. Davies S, Wastegård S, Abbott P, Barbante C, Bigler M, Johnsen S, Rasmussen T, Steffensen J, Svensson A (2010). "Tracing volcanic events in the NGRIP ice-core and synchronising North Atlantic marine records during the last glacial period". Earth and Planetary Science Letters. 294 (1–2): 69–79. Bibcode:2010E&PSL.294...69D. doi:10.1016/j.epsl.2010.03.004 – via swan.ac.uk.
34. Wastegård S, Davies S (2009). "An overview of distal tephrochronology in northern Europe during the last 1000 years". Journal of Quaternary Science. 24 (5): 500–512. Bibcode:2009JQS....24..500W. doi:10.1002/jqs.1269. S2CID 78089771 – via swan.ac.uk.
35. Davies S, Wastegård S, Rasmussen T, Svensson A, Johnsen S, Steffensen J, Andersen K (2008). "Identification of the Fugloyarbanki tephra in the NGRIP ice core: a key tie-point for marine and ice-core sequences during the last glacial period". Journal of Quaternary Science. 23 (5): 409–414. Bibcode:2008JQS....23..409D. doi:10.1002/jqs.1182. S2CID 129514572 – via swan.ac.uk.
36. Svensson A, Andersen K, Bigler M, Clausen H, Dahl-Jensen D, Davies S, Johnsen S, Muscheler R, Parrenin F, Rasmussen S, Röthlisberger R, Seierstad I, Steffensen J, Vinther B (2008). "A 60 000 year Greenland stratigraphic ice core chronology". Climate of the Past. 4 (1): 47–57. Bibcode:2008CliPa...4...47S. doi:10.5194/cp-4-47-2008 – via swan.ac.uk.
37. Veres D, Davies S, Wohlfarth B, Preusser F, Wastegård S, Ampel L, Hormes A, Possnert G, Raynal J, Vernet G (2008). "Age, origin and significance of a new middle MIS 3 tephra horizon identified within a long-core sequence from Les Echets, France". Boreas. 37 (3): 434–443. doi:10.1111/j.1502-3885.2008.00028.x. S2CID 129664431 – via swan.ac.uk.
38. Wohlfarth B, Veres D, Ampel L, Lacourse T, Blaauw M, Preusser F, Andrieu-Ponel V, Kéravis D, Lallier-Vergès E, Björck S, Davies S, Beaulieu J, Risberg J, Hormes A, Kasper H, Possnert G, Reille M, Thouveny N, Zander A (2008). "Rapid ecosystem response to abrupt climate changes during the last glacial period in western Europe, 40–16 ka". Geology. 36 (5): 407. Bibcode:2008Geo....36..407W. doi:10.1130/g24600a.1.
39. Davies S, Elmquist M, Bergman J, Wohlfarth B, Hammarlund D (2007). "Cryptotephra sedimentation processes within two lacustrine sequences from west central Sweden". The Holocene. 17 (3): 330. Bibcode:2007Holoc..17..319D. doi:10.1177/0959683607076443. S2CID 54970006 – via swan.ac.uk.
40. Veres D, Wohlfarth B, Andrieu-Ponel V, Björck S, Beaulieu J, Digerfeldt G, Ponel P, Ampel L, Davies S, Gandouin E, Belmecheri S (2007). "The lithostratigraphy of the Les Echets basin, France: tentative correlation between cores". Boreas. 36 (3): 340. doi:10.1080/03009480601061020 – via swan.ac.uk.
41. Svensson A, Andersen K, Bigler M, Clausen H, Dahl-Jensen D, Davies S, Johnsen S, Muscheler R, Rasmussen S, Röthlisberger R (2006). "The Greenland Ice Core Chronology 2005, 15–42ka. Part 2: comparison to other records". Quaternary Science Reviews. 25 (23–24): 3258–3267. Bibcode:2006QSRv...25.3258S. doi:10.1016/j.quascirev.2006.08.003 – via swan.ac.uk.
42. Turney C, Burg K, Wastegård S, Davies S, Whitehouse N, Pilcher J, Callaghan C (2006). "North European last glacial–interglacial transition (LGIT; 15–9 ka) tephrochronology: extended limits and new events". Journal of Quaternary Science. 21 (4): 335–345. Bibcode:2006JQS....21..335T. doi:10.1002/jqs.990. S2CID 140688417 – via swan.ac.uk.
43. Wohlfarth B, Blaauw M, Davies S, Andersson M, Wastegård S, Hormes A, Possnert G (2006). "Constraining the age of Lateglacial and early Holocene pollen zones and tephra horizons in southern Sweden with Bayesian probability methods". Journal of Quaternary Science. 21 (4): 321–334. Bibcode:2006JQS....21..321W. doi:10.1002/jqs.996. S2CID 67800522 – via swan.ac.uk.
44. Davies S, Hoek W, Bohncke S, Lowe J, O'donnell S, Turney C (2005). "Detection of Lateglacial distal tephra layers in the Netherlands". Boreas. 34 (2): 123–135. doi:10.1080/03009480510012944 – via swan.ac.uk.
45. Davies S (2004). "Were there two Borrobol Tephras during the early Lateglacial period: implications for tephrochronology?". Quaternary Science Reviews. 23 (5–6): 581–589. Bibcode:2004QSRv...23..581D. doi:10.1016/j.quascirev.2003.11.006 – via swan.ac.uk.
46. Lowe J, Walker M, Scott E, Harkness D, Bryant C, Davies S (2004). "A coherent high-precision radiocarbon chronology for the Late-glacial sequence at Sluggan Bog, Co. Antrim, Northern Ireland". Journal of Quaternary Science. 19 (2): 158. Bibcode:2004JQS....19..147L. doi:10.1002/jqs.814. S2CID 128696161 – via swan.ac.uk.
47. Turney C, Lowe J, Davies S, Hall V, Lowe D, Wastegård S, Hoek W, Alloway B (2004). "Tephrochronology of last termination sequences in Europe: a protocol for improved analytical precision and robust correlation procedures (a joint SCOTAV–INTIMATE proposal)". Journal of Quaternary Science. 19 (2): 120. Bibcode:2004JQS....19..111T. doi:10.1002/jqs.822. S2CID 130523375 – via swan.ac.uk.
48. Davies S, Wastegård S, Wohlfarth B (2003). "Extending the limits of the Borrobol Tephra to Scandinavia and detection of new early Holocene tephras". Quaternary Research. 59 (3): 345. Bibcode:2003QuRes..59..345D. doi:10.1016/s0033-5894(03)00035-8. S2CID 59409634.
49. Davies S, Branch N, Lowe J, Turney C (2002). "Towards a European tephrochronological framework for Termination 1 and the Early Holocene". Philosophical Transactions of the Royal Society A: Mathematical, Physical and Engineering Sciences. 360 (1793): 767–802. Bibcode:2002RSPTA.360..767D. doi:10.1098/rsta.2001.0964. PMID 12804303. S2CID 26578618 – via swan.ac.uk.
50. Mackie E, Turney C, Dobbyn K, Lowe J, Hill P, Davies S (2002). "The use of magnetic separation techniques to detect basaltic microtephra in last glacial-interglacial transition (LGIT; 15-10 ka cal. BP) sediment sequences in Scotland". Scottish Journal of Geology. 38: 21–30. doi:10.1144/sjg38010021. S2CID 128956174 – via swan.ac.uk.
51. Davies S, Turney C, Lowe J (2001). "Identification and significance of a visible, basalt-rich Vedde Ash layer in a Late-glacial sequence on the Isle of Skye, Inner Hebrides, Scotland". Journal of Quaternary Science. 16 (2): 99–104. Bibcode:2001JQS....16...99D. doi:10.1002/jqs.611. S2CID 128489017 – via swan.ac.uk.

== Prizes ==
- 2011 Philip Leverhulme prize in Geography £70,000
- 2013 Lyell Fund (Geological Society)
