= D. Jade Simon =

American paleontologist

D. Jade Simon is an American paleontologist, scientific communicator, and disability rights advocate. She is currently a Ph.D. candidate at the University of Toronto, where she studies the paleobiology of oviraptorosaur dinosaurs.

== Academic background ==
Simon obtained a Bachelor of Science in Geology and a Bachelor of Arts in Anthropology from West Virginia University in 2009. She obtained her M.Sc. in Earth Sciences from Montana State University, where she studied the Cretaceous oogenus Macroelongatoolithus with David Varricchio. From 2014 to 2016, she worked as a temporary lecturer and adjunct instructor at the College of Western Idaho (2014) and Boise State University (2014–2016), where she taught biology and geology courses. Since 2016, she has been a Ph.D. student at the University of Toronto and the Royal Ontario Museum, where she studies the ecology, growth, and diversity of North American oviraptorosaurs with David Evans.

== Academic contributions ==
Simon has published peer-reviewed articles on Cretaceous dinosaur faunas, dinosaur eggs, and the morphology and histology of oviraptorosaurs. Her research has been cited more than 90 times and is published in leading discipline journals such as the Journal of Vertebrate Paleontology and Papers in Palaeontology. She has received numerous awards in support of her research from academic societies, non-profits, and universities; this includes the General Motors Women in Science and Mathematics Award (2018); several grants from the Dinosaur Research Institute (2016, 2017, 2018), the Society of Systematic Biologists (2018), the Jurassic Foundation (2018), the International Alliance for Ability in Science's Outstanding Scholar in STEM Award (2021), and the prestigious Ontario Trillium Scholarship (2016–2020). She has also conducted an extensive array of paleontological and biological fieldwork, the former primarily in terrestrial Cretaceous deposits of Alberta, British Columbia, Idaho, Montana, Wyoming, and China, and the latter primarily with long-term monitoring of American kestrels in association with the Raptor Research Center.

== Advocacy and outreach ==
Simon is a leading disability rights advocate and is active in initiatives within universities and academies societies that seek to increase the visibility of, and the access for, disabled people in academic and research settings. She has a connective tissue disorder (generalized Hypermobile Spectrum Disorder / hypermobile Ehlers Danlos Syndrome), which affects her mobility and balance and can cause heart issues (commonly associated with dysautonomia) and for which she has a golden retriever service dog named Basil Mae, who is featured prominently in her scientific communication and outreach work. Simon and Basil Mae are active on social media and have been featured on numerous scientific communication outlets and media, including STEMcognito, The Science Pawdcast, the ROMKids Show hosted by the Royal Ontario Museum, and SoapboxScience, and in numerous articles highlighting her work and advocacy for disability rights.
