= Ysgol Gyfun Aberaeron =

Location
- Stryd y Fro; Aberaeron, Ceredigion, SA46 0DT; Wales; 52°14′29″N 4°14′49″W

Information
- Type: Comprehensive
- Established: 1978; 48 years ago
- Local authority: Ceredigion
- Head teacher: Owain Jones
- Gender: Mixed
- Age: 11 to 19
- Enrolment: 600 (2025)
- Language: Bilingual (Type C)
- Website: www.ygaberaeron.org.uk

Ysgol Gyfun Aberaeron is a bilingual comprehensive school for pupils aged between 11 and 19 years. The school is situated in the town of Aberaeron in Ceredigion, Wales. The school had 590 pupils on roll in 2024.

In 2014, 34% of pupils were from homes in which Welsh was the main language; however, 70% of pupils spoke Welsh as a first language or to an equal standard. In 2016, over 80% of pupils in Year 10 and Year 11 studied at least three examination subjects through the medium of Welsh. As of 2023, 31% of pupils came from Welsh-speaking homes.

The school ranked very low in the Welsh league tables (153rd out of 217 schools in Wales) in 2013. The school reached first position in the Western Mail league tables the following year (2014). The school achieved a 5 star rating (the highest possible ranking) for teaching; attainment and finance. According to the paper the “School’s mission to ‘provide a inclusive centre of excellence within a bilingual community’ has doubtless been achieved.”

== Notable former pupils ==
- Lee Jenkins - professional footballer for Newport County
- Alana Spencer - winner of BBC's The Apprentice series 12
- Bari Morgan - former professional footballer who played for Swansea City and Aberystwyth Town
- Seirian Sumner - Professor of entomology at UCL
- Josh Tarling - track and road cyclist, world junior time trial champion
- Finlay Tarling (2006 – 2026) - track and road cyclist, younger brother of Josh Tarling.
- Keib Thomas (1946 – 2007) - social activist
