= Equilibrative nucleoside transporter family =

Family of transport proteins

Members of the Equilibrative Nucleoside Transporter (ENT) Family (TC# 2.A.57) are transport proteins that are specific to nucleosides and nucleobases, and are part of the major facilitator superfamily. They generally possess at least 6, typically 10, transmembrane segments (TMSs) and are 300-600 amino acyl residues in length.

== Function ==
ENTs, including those in parasitic protozoa, function in nucleoside and nucleobase uptake for salvage pathways of nucleotide synthesis and, in humans, are also responsible for the cellular uptake of nucleoside analogues used in the treatment of cancers and viral diseases. By regulating the concentration of adenosine available to cell surface receptors, mammalian ENTs additionally influence physiological processes ranging from cardiovascular activity to neurotransmission.

== Human ENTs ==
In humans ENT are also known as SLC29, a group of plasmalemmal transport proteins which transport nucleoside substrates like adenosine into cells. There are four known human ENTs, designated ENT1, ENT2, ENT3, and ENT4. They are blocked by adenosine reuptake inhibitors like dipyridamole and dilazep, drugs used clinically for their vasodilatory properties.

The best-characterized members of the human Ent family, hENT1 and hENT2, possess similar broad permeant selectivities for purine and pyrimidine nucleosides, but hENT2 also efficiently transports nucleobases. hENT3 has a similar broad permeant selectivity for nucleosides and nucleobases and appears to function in intracellular membranes, including lysosomes. Gemcitabine, an anti-cancer drug, is transported by hENT1 and hENT3. hENT4 is uniquely selective for adenosine, and also transports a variety of organic cations.

A 5th protein, CLN3, shows significant structural similarities to SLC29 members, and is sometimes grouped together with them as part of the SLC29 gene/protein family.

== Transport reaction ==
The generalized transport reaction catalyzed by well characterized ENT family members is:

Nucleoside (out) → Nucleoside (in)

== See also ==
- Concentrative nucleoside transporter
- Nucleoside transporter
