= Idoxuridine =

Chemical compound

Clinical data
- Other names: Iododeoxyuridine; IUdR
- AHFS/Drugs.com: Micromedex Detailed Consumer Information
- MedlinePlus: a601062
- Pregnancy category: B1 (topical), B3 (ophthalmologic) [AU]
- Routes of administration: topically
- ATC code: D06BB01 (WHO) J05AB02 (WHO), S01AD01 (WHO)

Legal status
- Legal status: AU: S4 (Prescription only); In general: ℞ (Prescription only)

Identifiers
- IUPAC name: 1-[(2R,4S,5R)-4-hydroxy-5-(hydroxymethyl)oxolan-2-yl]-5-iodo-1,2,3,4-tetrahydropyrimidine-2,4-dione
- CAS Number: 54-42-2
- PubChem CID: 5905
- DrugBank: DB00249
- ChemSpider: 10481938
- UNII: LGP81V5245
- KEGG: D00342
- ChEMBL: ChEMBL788
- NIAID ChemDB: 001857
- CompTox Dashboard (EPA): DTXSID2045238
- ECHA InfoCard: 100.000.189

Chemical and physical data
- Formula: C_{9}H_{11}IN_{2}O_{5}
- Molar mass: 354.100 g·mol^{−1}
- 3D model (JSmol): Interactive image
- SMILES: I\C1=C\N(C(=O)NC1=O)C2C[C@H](O)[C@@H](CO)O2
- InChI: InChI=1S/C9H11IN2O5/c10-4-2-12(9(16)11-8(4)15)7-1-5(14)6(3-13)17-7/h2,5-7,13-14H,1,3H2,(H,11,15,16)/t5-,6+,7?/m0/s1; Key:XQFRJNBWHJMXHO-GFCOJPQKSA-N

Idoxuridine is an anti-herpesvirus antiviral drug.

It is a nucleoside analogue, a modified form of deoxyuridine, similar enough to be incorporated into viral DNA replication, but the iodine atom added to the uracil component blocks base pairing. It is used only topically due to cardiotoxicity. It was synthesized by William Prusoff in the late 1950s. Initially developed as an anticancer drug, idoxuridine became the first antiviral agent in 1962.

== Clinical use ==
Idoxuridine is mainly used topically to treat herpes simplex keratitis. Epithelial lesions, especially initial attacks presenting with a dendritic ulcer, are most responsive to therapy, while infection with stromal involvement are less responsive. Idoxuridine is ineffective against herpes simplex virus type 2 and varicella-zoster.

== Side effects ==
Common side effects of the eye drops include irritation, blurred vision and photophobia. Corneal clouding and damage of the corneal epithelium may also occur.

== Formulations and dosage ==
Idoxuridine is available as either a 0.5% ophthalmic ointment or as a 0.1% ophthalmic solution. The dosage of the ointment is every 4 hours during day and once before bedtime. The dosage of the solution is 1 drop in the conjunctival sac hourly during the day and every 2 hours during the night until definitive improvement, then 1 drop every 2 hours during the day and every 4 hours during the night. Therapy is continued for 3–4 days after healing is complete, as demonstrated by fluorescein staining.

== Synthesis ==
Idoxuridine synthesis.

== See also ==
- Trifluridine
- Acyclovir
- Foscarnet
