= Pyrimidine-deoxynucleoside 2'-dioxygenase =

Identifiers
- EC no.: 1.14.11.3
- CAS no.: 9076-89-5

Databases
- IntEnz: IntEnz view
- BRENDA: BRENDA entry
- ExPASy: NiceZyme view
- KEGG: KEGG entry
- MetaCyc: metabolic pathway
- PRIAM: profile
- PDB structures: RCSB PDB PDBe PDBsum
- Gene Ontology: AmiGO / QuickGO
Search
- PMC: articles
- PubMed: articles
- NCBI: proteins

Pyrimidine-deoxynucleoside 2'-dioxygenase (EC 1.14.11.3) is an enzyme that catalyzes the chemical reaction

deoxyuridine
Fe(IV)=O
Fe(II)
uridine

The enzyme converts deoxyuridine to uridine by oxidation using molecular oxygen.

This enzyme is an oxidoreductase with systematic name 2'-deoxyuridine,2-oxoglutarate:oxygen oxidoreductase (2'-hydroxylating). Other names in common use include deoxyuridine 2'-dioxygenase, deoxyuridine 2'-hydroxylase, pyrimidine deoxyribonucleoside 2'-hydroxylase, thymidine 2'-dioxygenase, thymidine 2'-hydroxylase, thymidine 2-oxoglutarate dioxygenase, and thymidine dioxygenase. It is a non-heme iron protein with ferryl active site where Fe(IV)=O is the species that transfers its oxygen to the substrate.

The mechanism used by these 2-oxoglutarate-dependent oxygenases requires 2-oxoglutaric acid to activate the iron oxygen complex, and this gives succinic acid and carbon dioxide when the second atom of the molecular oxygen is removed. Ascorbic acid enhances the turnover number of the enzyme by reducing any iron converted to Fe(III) back to the required Fe(II).

2-oxoglutaric acid
[O]
CO_{2}
succinic acid
