= Augustine blood group system =

Human blood group system

The Augustine blood group system is a human blood group system. It includes four red blood cell surface glycoprotein antigens which are encoded by alleles of the gene SLC29A1.

== Antigens ==
The protein which acts as the Augustine antigens is equilibrative nucleoside transporter 1, a transmembrane glycoprotein that mediates cellular uptake of nucleosides. This protein is abundant in erythroid progenitor cells and in mature red blood cells. There are four known variants of the antigen: AUG1, AUG2, AUG3, and AUG4. One person may express multiple variants; AUG:1,2,4 (expressing AUG1, AUG2, and AUG4) is the common phenotype.

List of Augustine antigens
Number	Name	Prevalence	Allele
AUG1		High	Splice site variant
AUG2	At^{a}	High	Glu391Lys
AUG3	ATML	Low	p.Thr387Pro
AUG4	ATAM	High	p.Asn81Ser

== Clinical significance ==
Antibodies against Augustine system antigens can be stimulated by pregnancy or blood transfusion and have the potential to cause severe hemolytic disease of the fetus and newborn and acute hemolytic transfusion reactions.

In red blood cells, the Augustine antigen protein seems to play a role in adenosine transport in cell differentiation, when immature cells become red blood cells. Individuals with the null phenotype, lacking any form of the transporter protein, have mineralization around the joints, ectopic calcification, and abnormal red blood cells.

== Clinical diagnostic ==
Clinical testing in patient care for AUG antigens follows published minimum quality and operational requirements, similar to red cell genotyping for any of the other recognized blood group systems. Molecular analysis can identify gene variants (alleles) that may affect AUG antigens expression on the red cell membrane.

== History ==
AUG2 was first identified as At^{a} in 1967 as a common human antigen. The SLC29A1 gene was identified in 1997 and found to encode AUG1 and AUG2 in 2015. In response to the 2015 discovery, the International Society of Blood Transfusion established the Augustine blood system as the 36th human blood group system. AUG3 and AUG4 were identified in 2018.

The blood group system was named Augustine after the surname of the individual with the first identified anti-At^{a} antibody, a woman of African ancestry whose third child had a positive direct antiglobulin test at birth.
