= Keib Thomas =

London social campaigner

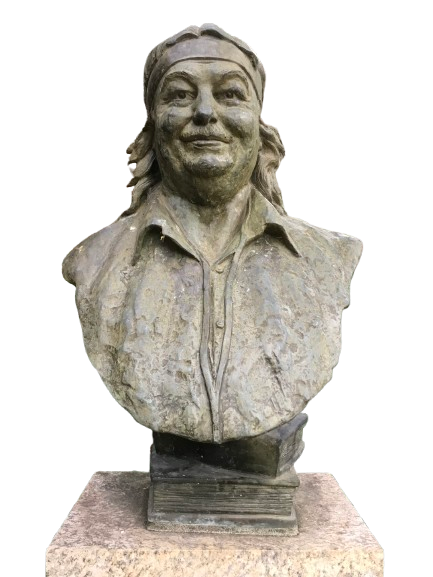
- Bust of Thomas in Burgess Park
- Born: December 21, 1946; Ceredigion, Wales, UK
- Died: July 1, 2007 (aged 60); UK
- Resting place: Himalayas
- Education: Ysgol Gyfun Aberaeron
- Known for: Community campaigning
- Style: Beatnik
- Spouse: Tinku

Keib Thomas (21 December 1946 - 1 July 2007) was a community development activist, college teacher, outreach worker, and community liaison worker in the London Borough of Southwark.

== Biography ==
=== Early life ===
Thomas was born in Ceredigion, the son of a Welsh butcher. As a child, he attended primary school in New Quay and then secondary at Ysgol Gyfun Aberaeron. As a schoolboy, Thomas first developed what he later termed a beatnik style by growing his hair long after reading the Mabinogion.

=== Activism ===
After finishing formal education, Thomas settled in London where he worked in a homeless soup kitchen run by St Mungo's. After seven years, he became a teacher at Morley College, before working at a community centre in Bermondsey. During the 1980s he was the gardening columnist for the local SE1 newspaper. In 2000 Thomas was approached by the Metropolitan Police to head their community liaison projects.

=== Death and legacy ===
Thomas died of a myocardial infarction in 2007, and his ashes were scattered in the Himalayas. Following his death, MP Simon Hughes praised Thomas for his "sustained and hugely appreciated contribution to Bermondsey and Southwark life over two decades". In January 2009 an early day motion was tabled, recognising Thomas's local activism and community work. His life and work have also been commemorated with a blue plaque and a bust in Burgess Park. In 2016 it was announced that a street of the redeveloped Aylesbury Estate would be named in his honour. His name is also remembered through the annual Keib Thomas Active Citizen of the Year award.
