= Equilibrative nucleoside transporter 1 =

Protein-coding gene in the species Homo sapiens

SLC29A1

Identifiers
- Aliases: SLC29A1, ENT1, Equilibrative nucleoside transporter 1, solute carrier family 29 member 1 (Augustine blood group)
- External IDs: OMIM: 602193; MGI: 1927073; GeneCards: SLC29A1

Gene location (Human)
Chr.	Chromosome 6 (human)
Band	6p21.1	Start	44,219,553 bp
Band	6p21.1	End	44,234,142 bp

Gene location (Mouse)
Chr.	Chromosome 17 (mouse)
Band	17|17 B3	Start	45,585,200 bp
Band	17|17 B3	End	45,599,606 bp
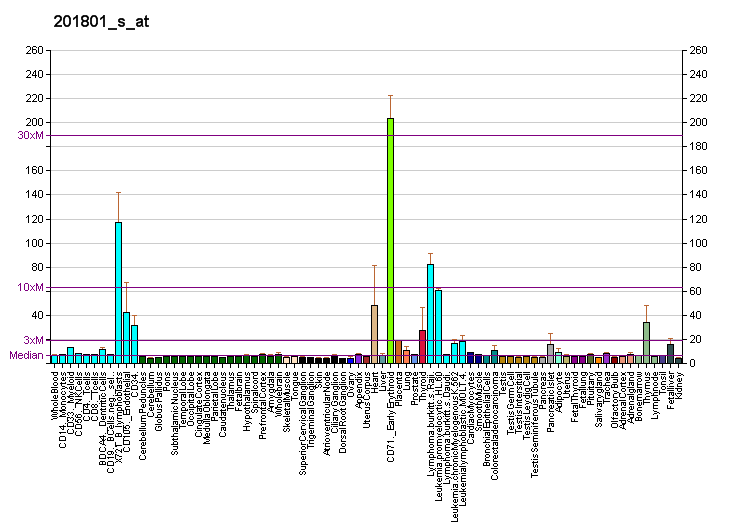

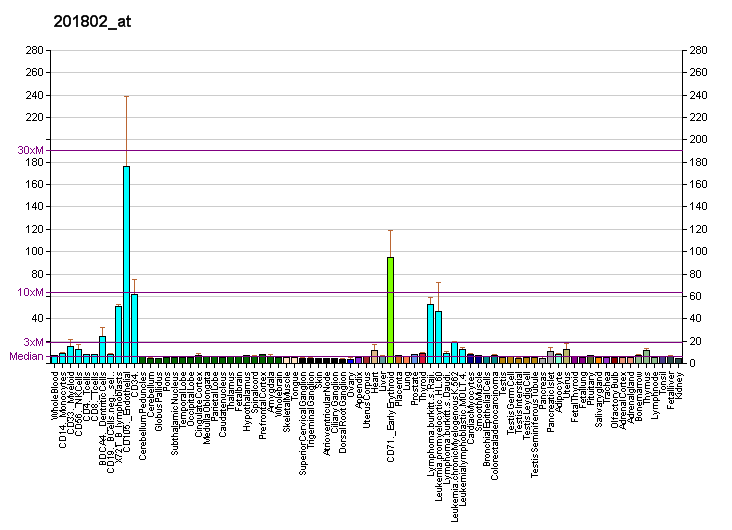
RNA expression pattern
Bgee	Human / Mouse (ortholog); Top expressed in: gastric mucosa; right coronary artery; apex of heart; right adrenal cortex; ascending aorta; body of stomach; right auricle of heart; left adrenal cortex; muscle layer of sigmoid colon; Descending thoracic aorta / Top expressed in: gastrula; stroma of bone marrow; ankle joint; lip; thymus; spermatocyte; calvaria; liver; lactiferous gland; muscle of thigh; More reference expression data
BioGPS	More reference expression data
Gene ontology
Molecular function	nucleoside transmembrane transporter activity
Cellular component	postsynapse; integral component of membrane; plasma membrane; basolateral plasma membrane; integral component of plasma membrane; apical plasma membrane; membrane; presynapse
Biological process	nucleoside transport; uridine transport; sleep; lactation; nucleoside transmembrane transport; nucleobase-containing compound metabolic process; cellular response to hypoxia; excitatory postsynaptic potential; cellular response to glucose stimulus; transport; neurotransmitter reuptake
Sources:Amigo / QuickGO
Orthologs
Databases	NCBI: entry; OMA: entry
Species	Human	Mouse
Entrez	2030	63959
Ensembl	ENSG00000112759	ENSMUSG00000023942
UniProt	Q99808	Q9JIM1
RefSeq (mRNA)	NM_001078174; NM_001078175; NM_001078176; NM_001078177; NM_001304462 NM_001304463; NM_001304465; NM_001304466; NM_004955; NM_001372327	NM_001199113; NM_001199114; NM_001199115; NM_001199116; NM_022880 NM_001357771
RefSeq (protein)	NP_001071643; NP_001071645; NP_001291391; NP_001291394; NP_001291395 NP_001359256	NP_001186042; NP_001186043; NP_001186044; NP_001186045; NP_075018 NP_001344700; NP_001363916; NP_001363917; NP_001363918; NP_001363919; NP_001363920; NP_001363921; NP_001363922; NP_001363923; NP_001363924; NP_001363925; NP_001363926; NP_001363927
Location (UCSC)	Chr 6: 44.22 – 44.23 Mb	Chr 17: 45.59 – 45.6 Mb
PubMed search
- Wikidata
View/Edit Human	View/Edit Mouse

Equilibrative nucleoside transporter 1 (ENT1) is a protein that in humans is encoded by the SLC29A1 gene. Multiple alternatively spliced variants, encoding the same protein, have been found for this gene. Expressed on red blood cell surfaces, these variants make up the Augustine blood group system.

== Function ==
This gene is a member of the equilibrative nucleoside transporter family. The gene encodes a transmembrane glycoprotein that localizes to the plasma and mitochondrial membranes and mediates the cellular uptake of nucleosides from the surrounding medium. The protein is categorized as an equilibrative (as opposed to concentrative) transporter that is sensitive to inhibition by nitrobenzylmercaptopurine ribonucleoside (NBMPR). Nucleoside transporters are required for nucleotide synthesis in cells that lack de novo nucleoside synthesis pathways, and are also necessary for the uptake of cytotoxic nucleosides used for cancer and viral chemotherapies.

== Genomics ==
The gene encoding this protein is located on the short arm of chromosome 6 at 6p21.2-p21.1 on the Watson (plus) strand. It is 14,647 bases in length. The encoded protein has 456 amino acid residues with 11 predicted transmembrane domains. The predicted molecular weight is 50.219 kilodaltons. The protein is post translationally glycosylated and expressed in all tissue with the apparent exception of skeletal muscle. The highest levels are found in the liver, heart, testis, spleen, lung, kidney and brain.

== Interactive pathway map ==
Click on genes, proteins and metabolites below to link to respective articles. (Note: The interactive pathway map can be edited at WikiPathways: "FluoropyrimidineActivity_WP1601".)

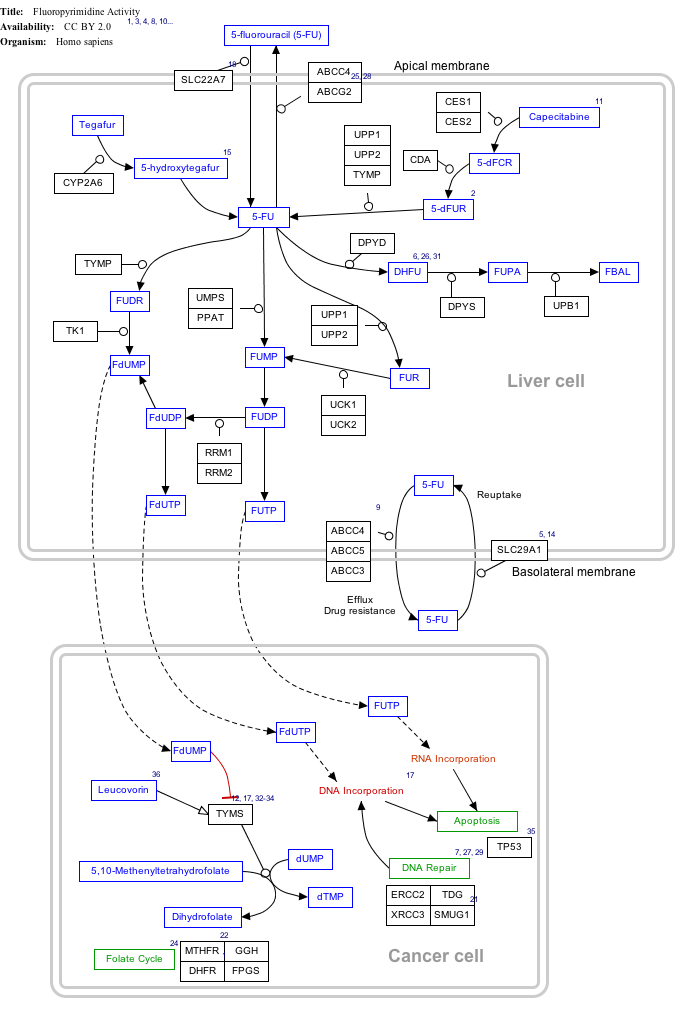

Fluorouracil (5-FU) Activity edit

== Clinical significance ==
Mutations in this gene have been associated with H syndrome, pigmented hypertrichosis with insulin dependent diabetes and Faisalabad histiocytosis.

Alleles of this gene make up the Augustine blood group system. Some of the four known variants are highly immunogenic and antibodies against them can cause acute hemolytic transfusion reaction and hemolytic disease of the fetus and newborn.

== See also ==
- Solute carrier family
- Nucleoside transporters
- Augustine blood group system
