= Seirian Sumner =

British entomologist and behavioural ecologist

Seirian Sumner FRES
- Born: 1974 (age 51–52); Aberystwyth, Wales, UK
- Education: University College London (BSc, PhD)
- Scientific career
- Workplaces: University of Bristol; University College London

Seirian Sumner (born 1974) FRES is a British entomologist and behavioural ecologist. She is a professor at University College London and is an expert in social wasps.

== Education and career ==
Sumner was educated at Ysgol Gyfun. Aberaeron, Wales and then at University College London where she was awarded a Bachelor of Science in Zoology and in 1999 was awarded a PhD on Conflicts over reproduction in facultatively eusocial hover wasps'. Her postdoctoral work was with Jacobus Boomsma at the University of Copenhagen in Denmark; she then held fellowships at the Smithsonian Tropical Research Institute in Panama and at the Institute of Zoology, London. Sumner moved to the University of Bristol as a Senior Lecturer in 2012 and then moved to University College London as a Reader in Behavioural Ecology in 2016 and Professor in 2020.

== Research ==
Sumner's research looks at the evolution of insect social behaviour and she has studied insect species along a continuum of sociality. She showed that insects can have simple sociality based on behaviour rather than physical characteristic of a caste, and that in these simple societies individuals can change caste from worker to queen, which is not possible in complex insect societies such as honeybees. Sumner made the first use of RFID tags in field research, finding that the movement of paper wasp queens away from their home nests was much higher than expected On more complex insect societies, Sumner did some of the first research on the genetic relatedness of bumblebee colonies, showing that sister queens emerging from the same colony travel far apart from each other to establish their new colonies. Sumner has looked at the effect of social insect populations on their environments such as the impact of Argentine ants on seed dispersal. She has worked on ants, looking at a parasitic ant species which evolved from and parasitises on a leaf-cutter species in Panama, she found that queens of the parasite species only mate with a single male, compared to the host leaf-cutter queens which mate with multiple males.

She is an advocate of the ecosystem services of social wasps saying that wasps are useful, indeed essential, that social wasps can be predators that can help control populations of pest insects, and that wasps matter. Sumner's lab are researching how social wasps might communicate within their colony about where resources are, perhaps like honey bees do the waggle dance. In 2019 she published a Proceedings of the Royal Society B article on showing how social paper wasps can be successful predators of two economically important pests the sugarcane borer and the fall armyworm. Her research on public attitudes to bees and wasps showed that the benefits of bees are widely understood but those of wasps are not, which is also reflected in the amount of scientific research into the two groups, with wasps being underresearched compared to bees. Sumner cofounded the citizen science initiative The Big Wasp Survey in 2017 with Professor Adam Hart to raise awareness of the role and diversity of social wasp species in the UK and to compare the accuracy of citizen science data with long-term biological recording data.

== Public activities ==
With Dr Nathalie Pettorelli of the Zoological Society of London, Sumner cofounded Soapbox Science in 2011, a platform that promotes women working in science. Sumner has taken part in several Pint of Science events, and has spoken at the Cheltenham Science Festival in 2016. With the FoAM Kernow lab in Falmouth, Sumner helped create an online game #wasplove for people to create their own wasp societies. Sumner was an invited speaker at the EntoSci event in 2020 talking about her career to 14 to 18 year olds. In 2022, Sumner gave an invited talk at New Scientist Live in London.

She has written a popular science book titled Endless Forms on wasps, published by William Collins in 2022. The Observer commented that the book "wearily" catalogues the "anti-wasp media" from Aristotle and Shakespeare to modern times, and that Sumner argues it is time to drop the "lazy tropes" associated with the wasp. Instead, she sets out the case for appreciating wasps, in science, society, and culture.
