= Concentrative nucleoside transporter 1 =

Protein found in humans

SLC28A1

Identifiers
- Aliases: SLC28A1, CNT1, HCNT1, Concentrative nucleoside transporter 1, solute carrier family 28 member 1, URCTU
- External IDs: OMIM: 606207; MGI: 3605073; GeneCards: SLC28A1

Gene location (Human)
Chr.	Chromosome 15 (human)
Band	15q25.3	Start	84,884,654 bp
Band	15q25.3	End	84,945,798 bp

Gene location (Mouse)
Chr.	Chromosome 7 (mouse)
Band	7|7 D3	Start	80,764,547 bp
Band	7|7 D3	End	80,820,164 bp
RNA expression pattern
Bgee	Human / Mouse (ortholog); Top expressed in: right lobe of liver; testicle; human kidney; duodenum; mucosa of ileum; jejunal mucosa; kidney tubule; muscle of thigh; apex of heart; renal medulla / Top expressed in: proximal tubule; duodenum; right kidney; human kidney; neck; pharynx; embryo; primary oocyte; bone marrow; secondary oocyte; More reference expression data
BioGPS	n/a
Gene ontology
Molecular function	nucleoside transmembrane transporter activity; pyrimidine- and adenine-specific:sodium symporter activity; nucleoside:sodium symporter activity
Cellular component	integral component of membrane; plasma membrane; membrane; integral component of plasma membrane
Biological process	pyrimidine nucleobase transport; nucleoside transport; pyrimidine-containing compound transmembrane transport; nucleoside transmembrane transport; nucleobase-containing compound metabolic process; purine nucleobase transmembrane transport
Sources:Amigo / QuickGO
Orthologs
Databases	NCBI: entry; OMA: entry
Species	Human	Mouse
Entrez	9154	434203
Ensembl	ENSG00000156222	ENSMUSG00000025726
UniProt	O00337	E9PXX9
RefSeq (mRNA)	NM_001287761; NM_001287762; NM_004213; NM_201651; NM_001321721 NM_001321722	NM_001004184
RefSeq (protein)	NP_001274690; NP_001274691; NP_001308650; NP_001308651; NP_004204 NP_964014	NP_001004184
Location (UCSC)	Chr 15: 84.88 – 84.95 Mb	Chr 7: 80.76 – 80.82 Mb
PubMed search
- Wikidata
View/Edit Human	View/Edit Mouse

Concentrative nucleoside transporter 1 (CNT1) is a protein that in humans is encoded by the SLC28A1 gene.

== See also ==
- Concentrative nucleoside transporters
- Nucleoside transporters
- Solute carrier family
