= Brenda Gallie =

Canadian ophthalmologist

- Spouse: Michael Jewett

Academic background
- Education: MD, 1969, Queen's University at Kingston

Academic work
- Institutions: Sick Kids Hospital
- Main interests: Retinoblastoma

Brenda Louise Gallie CM OOnt is a Canadian ophthalmologist. She is the Head of the Retinoblastoma Program in the Hospital for Sick Children (Toronto) Department of Ophthalmology and Vision Sciences.

== Early life and education ==
Gallie completed her medical degree at Queen's University at Kingston in 1969. Following this, she completed her residency and fellowship training at the University of Toronto and a second research fellowship in Immunology and Cancer at the Memorial Sloan-Kettering Cancer Center.

== Career ==
Upon completing her fellowships, Gallie joined Sick Kids Hospital where she made numerous discoveries about the cancer retinoblastoma. In January 1988, Gallie collaborated with Drs. Robert Phillips and Andy Becker to set up a Retinoblastoma Group in Toronto. This eventually led to the discovery of a new therapy for retinoblastoma. She discovered the fundamental principles of tumor suppressor genes and developed a new methodology to identify the RB1 gene. These tests accurately identified children at risk of developing retinoblastoma before they are born. In 1999, following the discovery of academic misconduct by Gideon Koren, Gallie moved her laboratory to Princess Margaret Hospital. She then opened her laboratory at Toronto Western Hospital a year later. By 2006, Gallie put forward a National Strategy to optimize care for retinoblastoma in Canada. She was also named a Member of the Order of Ontario for being an expert in the treatment of retinoblastoma and contributing to the health care of Canadians.

In 2013, Gallie led a research team that discovered a new and potentially less life-threatening form of retinoblastoma. The following year, Gallie was named a Member of the Order of Canada for her "contributions to the prevention, diagnosis and treatment of retinoblastoma, a childhood eye cancer." She was also recognized with the 2018 Helen Keller Prize for Vision Research and the 2019 Collaborative Leadership Research Grant from the non-profit Uplifting Athletes.

== Personal life ==
Gallie is married to urologist Michael Jewett.
