= Barbara Wohlfarth =

Quaternary geologist and paleoclimatologist

- Citizenship: Sweden
- Education: University of Bern (M.Sc., 1981); University of Cologne (Ph.D., 1986)
- Scientific career
- Fields: Paleoclimatology; Quaternary science
- Workplaces: Stockholm University

Barbara Wohlfarth is a Swedish, German and Swiss Quaternary geologist and paleoclimatologist active at Stockholm University. In 2012, she was elected into the Royal Swedish Academy of Sciences.
