= Soapbox Science =

Public outreach platform

Soapbox Science is a public outreach platform that promotes women working in science and the research that they do. The events turns public spaces into an area for learning and debate, in the spirit of Hyde Park's Speakers' Corner. Soapbox Science encourages scientists to explain their research to members of the public using non-traditional methods (for example, there is no use of a projector or slides). Speakers typically make props at home to explain the processes behind their research.

Soapbox Science launched in London in 2011, where it was led by Seirian Sumner and Nathalie Pettorelli. It aims to showcase eminent female scientists across the world.

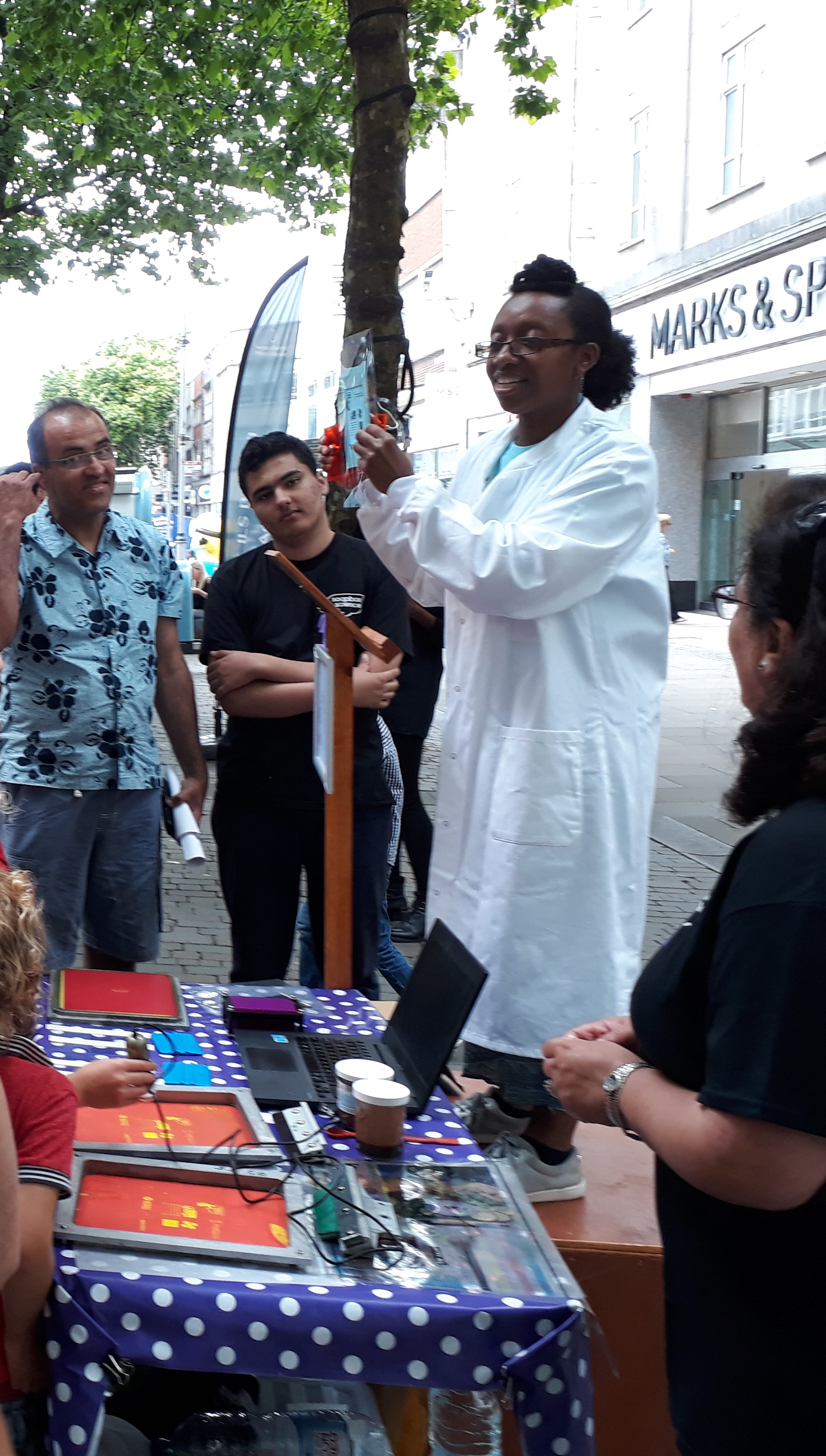
Dr Youmna Mouhamad at Soapbox Science - Swansea city centre 2016

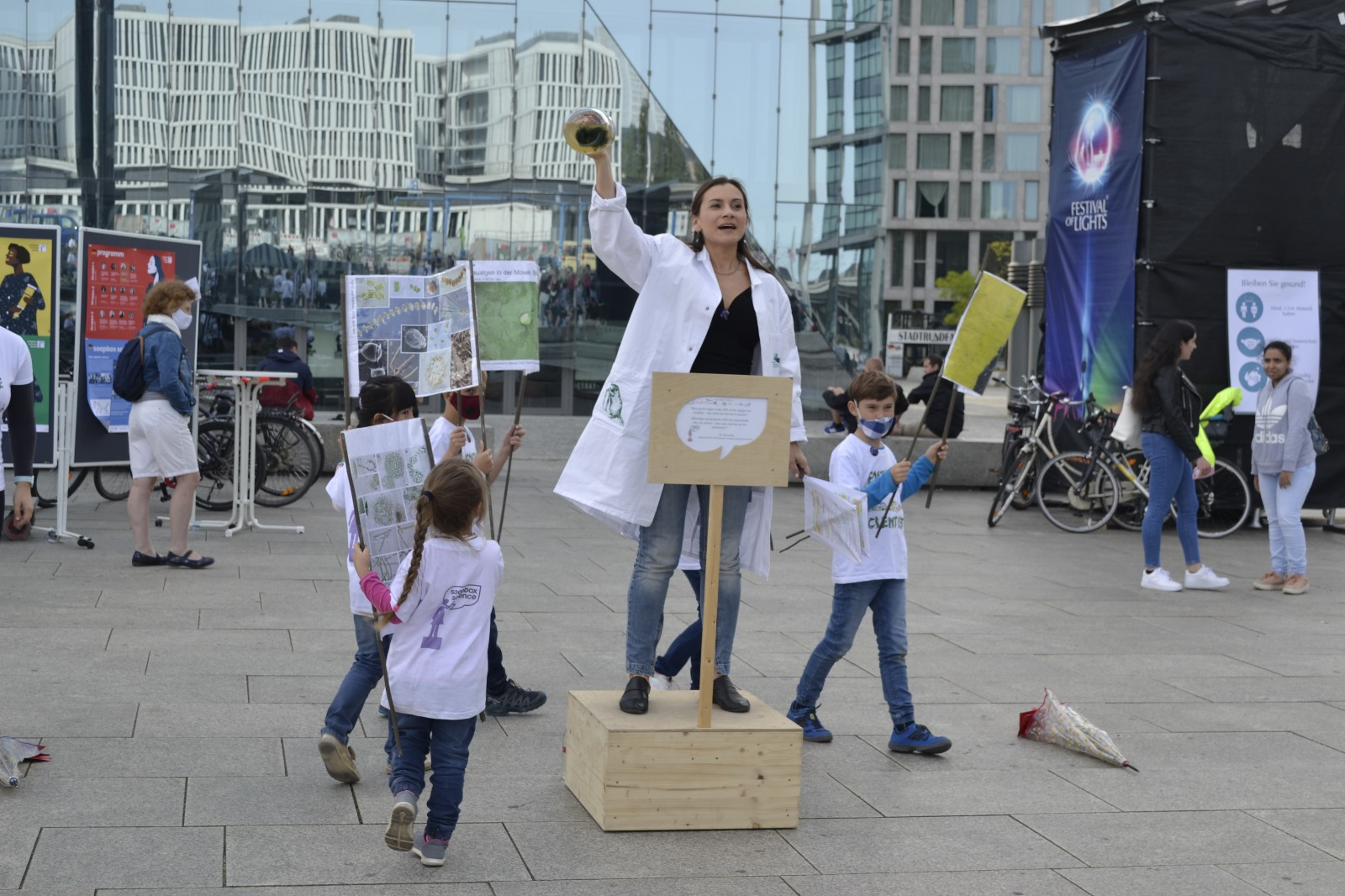
Dr Mina Bizic at Soapbox Science in Berlin 2020

== History ==
Soapbox Science launched in London in 2011, led by Seirian Sumner and Nathalie Pettorelli and funded by L'Oreal UNESCO For Women in Science Scheme, Zoological Society of London and the Science & Technology Facilities Council. Soapbox Science formed a partnership with Speakezee in 2016.

The first three annual events 2011-2013 ran in London, in 2014 events ran in London, Bristol, Dublin, and Swansea.

In 2015 more cities joined including Exeter, Manchester, Newcastle, Belfast and Glasgow, all in the United Kingdom and Ireland.

In 2016, Cambridge, Cardiff, Edinburgh, Milton Keynes, Oxford, Galway, Reading and Brisbane, Australia, ran events. The first Soapbox Science event in Canada was organized in Toronto, by then, Dean of Science, Imogen Coe of Toronto Metropolitan University (formerly Ryerson University).

By 2021, there were 45 events in 15 countries worldwide.

== Impact ==
Soapbox Science was established to complement other initiatives such as Athena SWAN that tackle the under-representation and low numbers of women employed in Science, Technology, Engineering and Mathematics (STEM) in the UK.

== Awards and honours ==
Serian Sumner and Nathalie Pettorelli were awarded a Point of Light Award in 2015 from the UK Prime Minister, a Silver Medal from the Zoological Society of London in 2016, presented by Sir John Beddington, and an Equality & Diversity Champion Award from the British Ecological Society in 2017, in recognition of their work on the Soapbox Science initiative.

=== Notable alumni ===
- Imogen Coe
- Athene Donald
- Sue Black OBE
- Julie Williams
- Hilary Lappin-Scott
- Karen Holford
- Sunetra Gupta
- Georgina Mace
- Lesley Yellowlees
- Maggie Aderin-Pocock
- Victoria Foster
- Goedele De Clerck
- Siwan Davies
- Farah Bhatti
- Mina Bizic
