= SLC22A2 =

Protein-coding gene

Identifiers
- Aliases: SLC22A2, OCT2, solute carrier family 22 member 2
- External IDs: OMIM: 602608; MGI: 1335072; GeneCards: SLC22A2

Gene location (Human)
Chr.	Chromosome 6 (human)
Band	6q25.3	Start	160,171,061 bp
Band	6q25.3	End	160,277,638 bp

Gene location (Mouse)
Chr.	Chromosome 17 (mouse)
Band	17 A1|17 8.61 cM	Start	12,803,019 bp
Band	17 A1|17 8.61 cM	End	12,847,375 bp
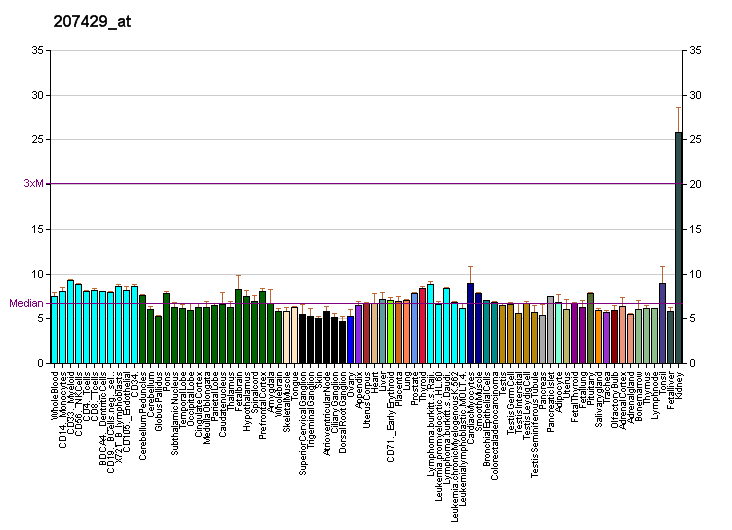
RNA expression pattern
Bgee	Human / Mouse (ortholog); Top expressed in: kidney tubule; renal medulla; human kidney; testicle; glomerulus; metanephric glomerulus; buccal mucosa cell; oocyte; secondary oocyte; right coronary artery / Top expressed in: right kidney; proximal tubule; human kidney; yolk sac; proximal convoluted tubule; proximal straight tubule; respiratory epithelium; olfactory epithelium; sciatic nerve; embryo; More reference expression data
BioGPS	More reference expression data
Gene ontology
Molecular function	transmembrane transporter activity; transporter activity; neurotransmitter transmembrane transporter activity; quaternary ammonium group transmembrane transporter activity; organic cation transmembrane transporter activity; acetylcholine transmembrane transporter activity; norepinephrine:sodium symporter activity; secondary active organic cation transmembrane transporter activity; organic anion transmembrane transporter activity
Cellular component	integral component of membrane; membrane; plasma membrane; extracellular exosome; integral component of plasma membrane; presynapse
Biological process	xenobiotic transmembrane transport; body fluid secretion; quaternary ammonium group transport; neurotransmitter biosynthetic process; cation transport; ion transport; dopamine transport; neurotransmitter secretion; organic cation transport; transmembrane transport; ammonium transmembrane transport; neurotransmitter transport; organic anion transport; norepinephrine transport; acetate ester transport; transport
Sources:Amigo / QuickGO
Orthologs
Databases	NCBI: entry; OMA: entry
Species	Human	Mouse
Entrez	6582	20518
Ensembl	ENSG00000112499	ENSMUSG00000040966
UniProt	O15244	O70577
RefSeq (mRNA)	NM_153191; NM_003058	NM_013667; NM_001355767
RefSeq (protein)	NP_003049	NP_038695; NP_001342696
Location (UCSC)	Chr 6: 160.17 – 160.28 Mb	Chr 17: 12.8 – 12.85 Mb
PubMed search
- Wikidata
View/Edit Human	View/Edit Mouse

Solute carrier family 22 member 2 (also termed OCT2 or organic cation transporter-2) is a protein that in humans is encoded by the SLC22A2 gene.

Poly specific organic cation transporters in the liver, kidney, intestine, and other organs are important for elimination of many endogenous small organic cations as well as a wide array of drugs and environmental toxins. This gene is one of three similar cation transporter genes located in a cluster on chromosome 6. The encoded protein contains twelve putative transmembrane domains and is a plasma integral membrane protein. It is found primarily in the kidney, where it may mediate the first step in cation reabsorption.

== See also ==
- Solute carrier family
