= Equilibrative nucleoside transporter 2 =

Protein-coding gene in the species Homo sapiens

SLC29A2

Identifiers
- Aliases: SLC29A2, DER12, ENT2, HNP36, Equilibrative nucleoside transporter 2, solute carrier family 29 member 2
- External IDs: OMIM: 602110; MGI: 1345278; GeneCards: SLC29A2

Gene location (Human)
Chr.	Chromosome 11 (human)
Band	11q13.2	Start	66,362,521 bp
Band	11q13.2	End	66,372,214 bp

Gene location (Mouse)
Chr.	Chromosome 19 (mouse)
Band	19|19 A	Start	5,023,860 bp
Band	19|19 A	End	5,031,972 bp
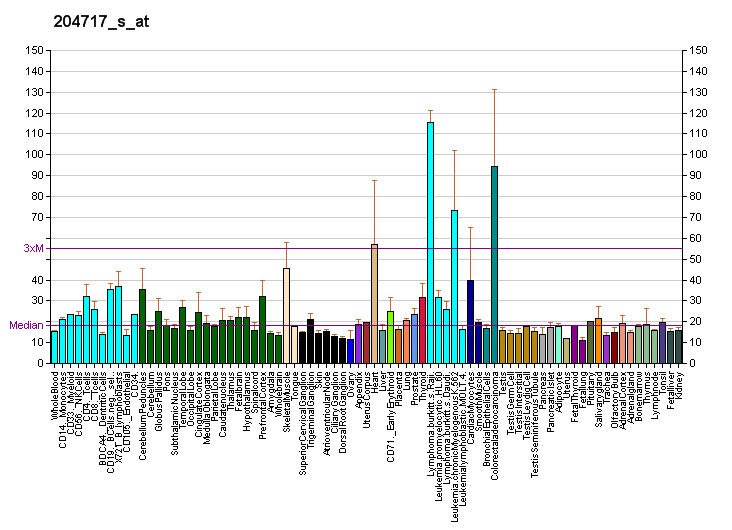
RNA expression pattern
Bgee	Human / Mouse (ortholog); Top expressed in: gastrocnemius muscle; muscle of thigh; apex of heart; mucosa of transverse colon; right hemisphere of cerebellum; right auricle of heart; body of tongue; vastus lateralis muscle; skeletal muscle tissue; Skeletal muscle tissue of rectus abdominis / Top expressed in: neural layer of retina; yolk sac; tail of embryo; genital tubercle; embryo; embryo; epiblast; superior frontal gyrus; muscle of thigh; dentate gyrus of hippocampal formation granule cell; More reference expression data
BioGPS	More reference expression data
Gene ontology
Molecular function	nucleoside transmembrane transporter activity
Cellular component	integral component of membrane; plasma membrane; basolateral plasma membrane; integral component of plasma membrane; nuclear membrane; nucleolus; membrane; nucleus; presynapse
Biological process	nucleoside transport; cell population proliferation; nucleoside transmembrane transport; nucleobase-containing compound metabolic process; adenine transport; guanine transport; uridine transport; hypoxanthine transport; thymine transport; neurotransmitter reuptake
Sources:Amigo / QuickGO
Orthologs
Databases	NCBI: entry; OMA: entry
Species	Human	Mouse
Entrez	3177	13340
Ensembl	ENSG00000174669	ENSMUSG00000024891
UniProt	Q14542	Q61672
RefSeq (mRNA)	NM_001300868; NM_001300869; NM_001532	NM_007854
RefSeq (protein)	NP_001287797; NP_001287798; NP_001523	NP_031880
Location (UCSC)	Chr 11: 66.36 – 66.37 Mb	Chr 19: 5.02 – 5.03 Mb
PubMed search
- Wikidata
View/Edit Human	View/Edit Mouse

Equilibrative nucleoside transporter 2 (ENT2) is a protein that in humans is encoded by the SLC29A2 gene.

== See also ==
- Solute carrier family
- Equilibrative nucleoside transporters
- Nucleoside transporters
