= Concentrative nucleoside transporter =

Nucleos_tra2_C

Identifiers
- Symbol: Nucleos_tra2_C
- Pfam: PF07662
- InterPro: IPR011657
- TCDB: 2.A.41
- OPM superfamily: 388
- OPM protein: 3tij
Available protein structures:
- PDB: IPR011657 PF07662 (ECOD; PDBsum)
- AlphaFold: IPR011657; PF07662

Human concentrative nucleoside transporters include SLC28A1, SLC28A2 and SLC28A3 proteins. SLC28A2 is a purine-specific Na^{+}-nucleoside cotransporter localised to the bile canalicular membrane. SLC28A1 is a Na^{+}-dependent nucleoside transporter selective for pyrimidine nucleosides and adenosine. It also transports the anti-viral nucleoside analogues Zidovudine and Zalcitabine.
