= H syndrome =

- Other names: Histiocytosis-lymphadenopathy plus syndrome
- This condition is inherited in an autosomal recessive manner
- Frequency: 0.0001%

H syndrome, also known as Histiocytosis-lymphadenopathy plus syndrome or PHID, is a rare genetic condition caused by mutations in the SLC29A3 gene which encode the human equilibrative nucleoside transporter 3 (hENT3) protein.

It is also known as Faisalabad histiocytosis, familial Rosai-Dorfman disease, sinus histiocytosis with massive lymphadenopathy and pigmented hypertrichosis with insulin-dependent diabetes mellitus syndrome.

== Presentation ==
This syndrome has a number of different clinical features many of which start with the letter 'H' giving rise to the name of the syndrome. These features include

- Hyperpigmentation
- Hypertrichosis
- Hepatosplenomegaly
- Hearing loss
- Heart anomalies
- Hypogonadism
- Low height (short stature)
- Hyperglycemia/diabetes mellitus
- Hallux valgus/flexion contractures

Exophthalmos, malabsorption and renal anomalies have also been reported.

== Genetics ==
The SLC29A3 gene is located on the long arm of chromosome 10 (10q22).The causative gene was identified in 2010.

== Pathogenesis ==
This is not understood at present.

== Management ==
There is no curative treatment for this condition at present. Management is directed to the clinical features.

== History ==
This condition was first described in 1998.
