= Deoxyuridine =

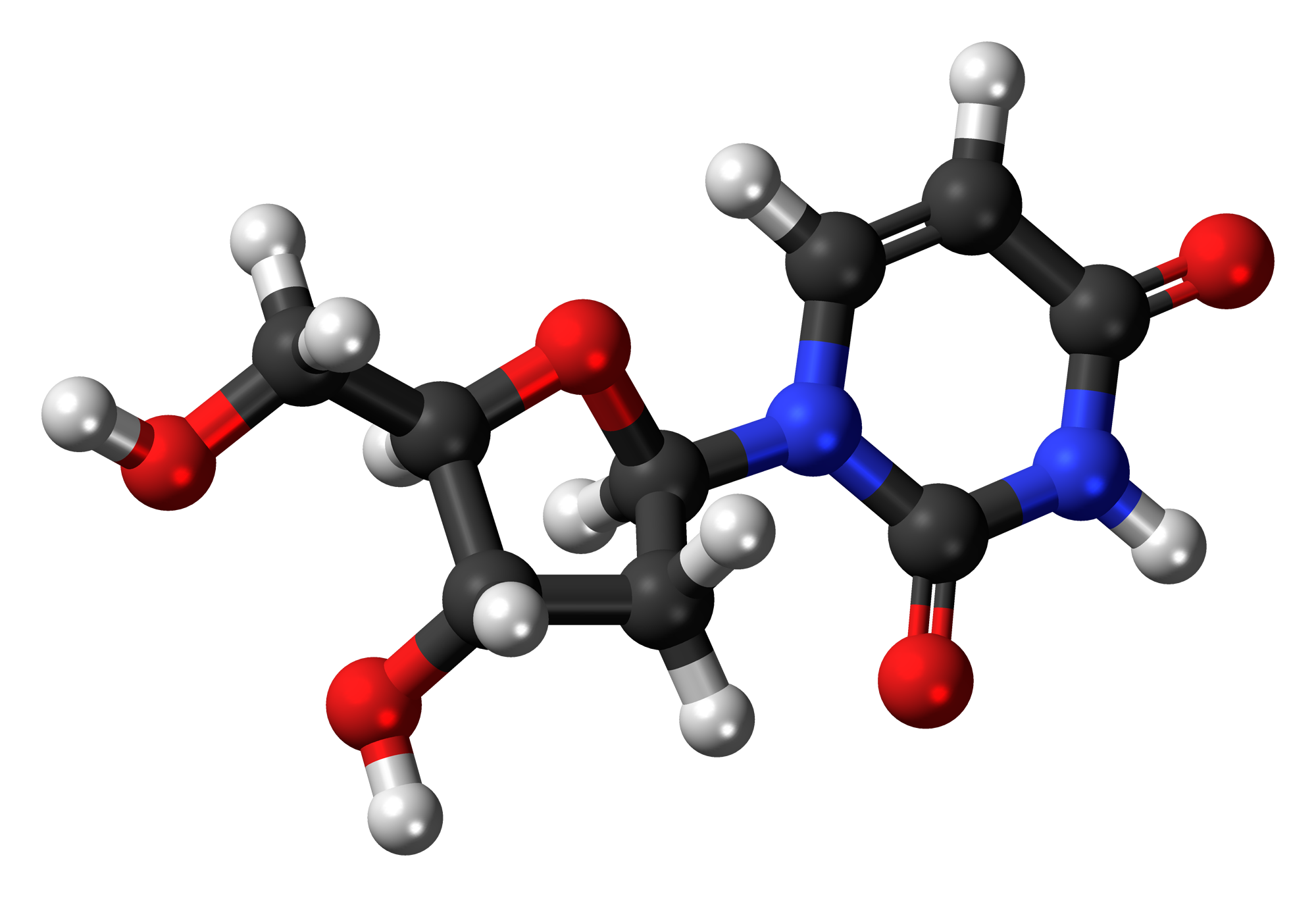

Names
- IUPAC name 2′-Deoxyuridine
- Systematic IUPAC name 1-[(2R,4S,5R)-4-Hydroxy-5-(hydroxymethyl)oxolan-2-yl]pyrimidine-2,4(1H,3H)-dione

Identifiers
CAS Number	951-78-0
3D model (JSmol)	Interactive image
ChEBI	CHEBI:16450
ChEMBL	ChEMBL353955
ChemSpider	13118
ECHA InfoCard	100.012.232
MeSH	Deoxyuridine
PubChem CID	640
UNII	W78I7AY22C
CompTox Dashboard (EPA)	DTXSID30883621
- InChI: InChI=1S/C9H12N2O5/c12-4-6-5(13)3-8(16-6)11-2-1-7(14)10-9(11)15/h1-2,5-6,8,12-13H,3-4H2,(H,10,14,15)/t5-,6+,8+/m0/s1 Key: MXHRCPNRJAMMIM-SHYZEUOFSA-N; InChI=1/C9H12N2O5/c12-4-6-5(13)3-8(16-6)11-2-1-7(14)10-9(11)15/h1-2,5-6,8,12-13H,3-4H2,(H,10,14,15)/t5-,6+,8+/m0/s1 Key: MXHRCPNRJAMMIM-SHYZEUOFBK
- SMILES: O=C/1NC(=O)N(\C=C\1)[C@@H]2O[C@@H]([C@@H](O)C2)CO

Properties
Chemical formula	C_{9}H_{12}N_{2}O_{5}
Molar mass	228.202
- Except where otherwise noted, data are given for materials in their standard state (at 25 °C [77 °F], 100 kPa). verify (what is ?) Infobox references

Deoxyuridine (dU) is a compound and a nucleoside. It belongs to a class of compounds known as Pyrimidine 2'-deoxyribonucleosides and closely resembles the chemical composition of uridine but without the presence of the 2' hydroxyl group. Idoxuridine and Trifluridine are variants of deoxyuridine used as antiviral drugs. They are similar enough to be incorporated as part of DNA replication, but they possess side groups on the uracil component (an iodine and a CF_{3} group, respectively), that prevent base pairing. A known use of dU is as a precursor in the synthesis of Edoxudine.

This compound exists in all living organisms and can become part of DNA in both prokaryotic and eukaryotic cells through two mechanisms. The first is the removal of an amino group from cytosine to result in uracil and the second is the non-intentional incorporation of pyrimidine where thymine belongs in the DNA, resulting in dUMP.

UMP synthase deficiency is a metabolic disorder in humans that involves deoxyuridine. Deoxyuridine can be toxic. It has also been found in several foods, which makes it a useful indicator for diseases through consumption of those foods.
