= Nucleoside transporter =

Transport protein that transports nucleosides across cell membranes

Nucleoside transporters (NTs) are a group of membrane transport proteins which transport nucleoside substrates like adenosine across the membranes of cells and/or vesicles. There are two known types of nucleoside transporters, concentrative nucleoside transporters (CNTs; SLC28) and equilibrative nucleoside transporters (ENTs; SLC29), as well as possibly a yet-unidentified vesicular transporter.
