= Pharmacodynamics =

Branch of pharmacology that studies how a drug affects an organism

Topics of pharmacodynamics

Pharmacodynamics (PD) is the study of the biochemical and physiologic effects of drugs (especially pharmaceutical drugs). The effects can include those manifested within animals (including humans), microorganisms, or combinations of organisms (for example, infection).

Pharmacodynamics and pharmacokinetics are the main branches of pharmacology, being itself a topic of biology interested in the study of the interactions of both endogenous and exogenous chemical substances with living organisms.

In particular, pharmacodynamics is the study of how a drug affects an organism, whereas pharmacokinetics is the study of how the organism affects the drug. Both together influence dosing, benefit, and adverse effects. Pharmacodynamics is sometimes abbreviated as PD and pharmacokinetics as PK, especially in combined reference (for example, when speaking of PK/PD models).

Pharmacodynamics places particular emphasis on dose–response relationships, that is, the relationships between drug concentration and effect. One dominant example is drug-receptor interactions as modeled by

$$\ce{L + R <=> LR}$$

where L, R, and LR represent ligand (drug), receptor, and ligand-receptor complex concentrations, respectively. This equation represents a simplified model of reaction dynamics that can be studied mathematically through tools such as free energy maps.

IUPAC definition

Pharmacodynamics: Study of pharmacological actions on living systems, including the reactions with and binding to cell constituents, and the biochemical and physiological consequences of these actions.

== Drug Targets ==
There are four principal protein targets with which drugs can interact:

- Enzymes – (e.g. neostigmine and acetyl cholinesterase)
  - Inhibitors
  - Inducers
  - Activators
- Membrane carriers – [Reuptake vs Efflux] (e.g. tricyclic antidepressants and catecholamine uptake-1)
  - Enhancer (RE)
  - Inhibitor (RI)
  - Releaser (RA)
- Ion channels – (e.g. nimodipine and voltage-gated Ca^{2+} channels)
  - Blocker
  - Opener
- Receptor – (e.g. Listed in table below)
  - Agonists can be full, partial or inverse.
  - Antagonists can be competitive, non-competitive, or uncompetive.
  - Allosteric modulator can have 3 effects within a receptor. One is its capability or incapability to activate a receptor (2 possibilities). The other two are agonist affinity and efficacy. They may be increased, decreased or unaffected (3 and 3 possibilities).

Receptors can be subdivided into four main classes: ligand-gated ion channels(LGIC), tyrosine kinase-coupled(TRK), intracellular steroid, G-protein-coupled (GPCR).
	LGIC	TRK	Steroid	GPCR
Location	Membrane	Membrane	Intracellular	Membrane
Main action	Ion flux	Phosphorylation	Gene transcription	2nd messengers
Example/drug	Nicotinic/NMBD	Insulin/insulin	Steroid/thyroxine	Opioid/morphine
	NMDA/ketamine	Growth factor/EGF	Steroid/oestrogen	Adrenoceptor/isoprenaline

NMBD = neuromuscular blocking drugs; NMDA = N-methyl-d-aspartate; EGF = epidermal growth factor.

== Effects on the body ==
The majority of drugs either

1. induce(mimic) or inhibit(prevent) normal physiological/biochemical processes and pathological processes in animals or
2. inhibit vital processes of endo- or ectoparasites and microbial organisms.

There are 7 main drug actions:

- stimulating action through direct receptor agonism and downstream effects
- depressing action through direct receptor agonism and downstream effects (ex.: inverse agonist)
- blocking/antagonizing action (as with silent antagonists), the drug binds the receptor but does not activate it
- stabilizing action, the drug seems to act neither as a stimulant or as a depressant (ex.: some drugs possess receptor activity that allows them to stabilize general receptor activation, like buprenorphine in opioid dependent individuals or aripiprazole in schizophrenia, all depending on the dose and the recipient)
- exchanging/replacing substances or accumulating them to form a reserve (ex.: glycogen storage)
- direct beneficial chemical reaction as in free radical scavenging
- direct harmful chemical reaction which might result in damage or destruction of the cells, through induced toxic or lethal damage (cytotoxicity or irritation)

Some molecular mechanisms of pharmacological agents

=== Desired activity ===
The desired activity of a drug is mainly due to successful targeting of one of the following:

- Cellular membrane disruption
- Chemical reaction with downstream effects
- Interaction with enzyme proteins
- Interaction with structural proteins
- Interaction with carrier proteins
- Interaction with ion channels
- Ligand binding to receptors:
  - Hormone receptors
  - Neuromodulator receptors
  - Neurotransmitter receptors

General anesthetics were once thought to work by disordering the neural membranes, thereby altering the Na^{+} influx. Antacids and chelating agents combine chemically in the body. Enzyme-substrate binding is a way to alter the production or metabolism of key endogenous chemicals, for example aspirin irreversibly inhibits the enzyme prostaglandin synthetase (cyclooxygenase) thereby preventing inflammatory response. Colchicine, a drug for gout, interferes with the function of the structural protein tubulin, while digitalis, a drug still used in heart failure, inhibits the activity of the carrier molecule, Na-K-ATPase pump. The widest class of drugs act as ligands that bind to receptors that determine cellular effects. Upon drug binding, receptors can elicit their normal action (agonist), blocked action (antagonist), or even action opposite to normal (inverse agonist).

In principle, a pharmacologist would aim for a target plasma concentration of the drug for a desired level of response. In reality, there are many factors affecting this goal. Pharmacokinetic factors determine peak concentrations, and concentrations cannot be maintained with absolute consistency because of metabolic breakdown and excretory clearance. Genetic factors may exist which would alter metabolism or drug action itself, and a patient's immediate status may also affect indicated dosage.

=== Undesirable effects ===
Undesirable effects of a drug include:

- Increased probability of cell mutation (carcinogenic activity)
- A multitude of simultaneous assorted actions which may be deleterious
- Interaction (additive, multiplicative, or metabolic)
- Induced physiological damage, or abnormal chronic conditions
- Overstimulation or Inhibition of receptors- lead to harmful physiological changes
- Development of tolerance - reduce their responsiveness, requiring higher doses of drug.
- Induced pathological conditions - long term structural or functional changes
- Disturbed homeostasis
- Functional selectivity (biased Agonism) - preferentially activate certain pathways over others, potentially leading to off-target or unanticipated effects.

=== Therapeutic window ===
The therapeutic window is the amount of a medication between the amount that gives an effect (effective dose) and the amount that gives more adverse effects than desired effects. For instance, medication with a small pharmaceutical window must be administered with care and control, e.g. by frequently measuring blood concentration of the drug, since it easily loses effects or gives adverse effects.

=== Duration of action ===
The duration of action of a drug is the length of time that particular drug is effective. Duration of action is a function of several parameters including plasma half-life, the time to equilibrate between plasma and target compartments, and the off rate of the drug from its biological target.

==== Recreational drug use ====
In recreational psychoactive drug spaces, duration refers to the length of time over which the subjective effects of a psychoactive substance manifest themselves. Duration can be broken down into 6 parts: (1) total duration (2) onset (3) come up (4) peak (5) offset and (6) after effects. Depending upon the substance consumed, each of these occurs in a separate and continuous fashion.

==== Total ====
The total duration of a substance can be defined as the amount of time it takes for the effects of a substance to completely wear off into sobriety, starting from the moment the substance is first administered.

==== Onset ====
The onset phase can be defined as the period until the very first changes in perception (i.e. "first alerts") are able to be detected.

==== Come up ====
The "come up" phase can be defined as the period between the first noticeable changes in perception and the point of highest subjective intensity. This is colloquially known as "coming up."

==== Peak ====
The peak phase can be defined as period of time in which the intensity of the substance's effects are at its height.

==== Offset ====
The offset phase can be defined as the amount of time in between the conclusion of the peak and shifting into a sober state. This is colloquially referred to as "coming down."

==== After effects ====
The after effects can be defined as any residual effects which may remain after the experience has reached its conclusion. After effects depend on the substance and usage. This is colloquially known as a "hangover" for negative after effects of substances, such as alcohol, cocaine, and MDMA or an "afterglow" for describing a typically positive, pleasant effect, typically found in substances such as cannabis, LSD in low to high doses, and ketamine.

== Receptor binding and effect ==
The binding of ligands (drug) to receptors is governed by the law of mass action which relates the large-scale status to the rate of numerous molecular processes. The rates of formation and un-formation can be used to determine the equilibrium concentration of bound receptors. The equilibrium dissociation constant is defined by:

$\ce{L + R <=> LR}$ $K_d = \frac{[L][R]}{[L R]}$

where L=ligand, R=receptor, square brackets [] denote concentration. The fraction of bound receptors is

$${p}_{LR} = \frac{[L R]}{[R]+[L R]} =\frac{1}{1+\frac{K_d}{[L]}}$$

Where ${p}_{LR}$ is the fraction of receptor bound by the ligand.

This expression is one way to consider the effect of a drug, in which the response is related to the fraction of bound receptors (see: Hill equation). The fraction of bound receptors is known as occupancy. The relationship between occupancy and pharmacological response is usually non-linear. This explains the so-called receptor reserve phenomenon i.e. the concentration producing 50% occupancy is typically higher than the concentration producing 50% of maximum response. More precisely, receptor reserve refers to a phenomenon whereby stimulation of only a fraction of the whole receptor population apparently elicits the maximal effect achievable in a particular tissue.

The simplest interpretation of receptor reserve is that it is a model that states there are excess receptors on the cell surface than what is necessary for full effect. Taking a more sophisticated approach, receptor reserve is an integrative measure of the response-inducing capacity of an agonist (in some receptor models it is termed intrinsic efficacy or intrinsic activity) and of the signal amplification capacity of the corresponding receptor (and its downstream signaling pathways). Thus, the existence (and magnitude) of receptor reserve depends on the agonist (efficacy), tissue (signal amplification ability) and measured effect (pathways activated to cause signal amplification). As receptor reserve is very sensitive to agonist's intrinsic efficacy, it is usually defined only for full (high-efficacy) agonists.

Often the response is determined as a function of log[L] to consider many orders of magnitude of concentration. However, there is no biological or physical theory that relates effects to the log of concentration. It is just convenient for graphing purposes. It is useful to note that 50% of the receptors are bound when [L]=K_{d} .

The graph shown represents the conc-response for two hypothetical receptor agonists, plotted in a semi-log fashion. The curve toward the left represents a higher potency (potency arrow does not indicate direction of increase) since lower concentrations are needed for a given response. The effect increases as a function of concentration.

== Multicellular pharmacodynamics ==
The concept of pharmacodynamics has been expanded to include multicellular pharmacodynamics (MCPD). MCPD is the study of the static and dynamic properties and relationships between a set of drugs and a dynamic and diverse multicellular four-dimensional organization. It is the study of the workings of a drug on a minimal multicellular system (mMCS), both in vivo and in silico. Networked Multicellular Pharmacodynamics (Net-MCPD) further extends the concept of MCPD to model regulatory genomic networks together with signal transduction pathways, as part of a complex of interacting components in the cell.

== Toxicodynamics ==
Toxicodynamics (TD) and pharmacodynamics (PD) link a therapeutic agent or toxicant, or toxin (xenobiotic)'s dosage to the features, amount, and time course of its biological action. The mechanism of action is a crucial factor in determining effect and toxicity of the drug, taking in consideration the pharmacokinetic (PK) factors. The sort and extent of altered cellular physiology will depend on the combination of the drug's presence (as established by pharmacokinetic (PK) studies) and/or its mechanism and duration of action (PD). Types of xenobiotic-target interaction can be described either by reversible, irreversible, noncompetitive, and allosteric interaction or agonist, partial agonist, antagonist, and inverse interactions. In vitro, ex vivo, or in vivo studies can be used to assess PD and TD from the molecule to the level of the entire organism.

The mechanism of drug action and adverse drug reaction is either physiochemical property based and biochemical based. Adverse drugs reactions can be classified as either idiosyncratic (type B) or intrinsic (type A). Idiosyncratic toxicity is not dosage dependent and defy the mass-action relationship. Immune-mediated processes are frequently cited as the source of type B reactions. These cannot be accurately described in preclinical research or clinical trials due to their low incidence frequency. Type A reactions are dosage (concentration) dependent. Usually, this kind of side effect is an extension of an ongoing treatment.

Pharmacokinetics and pharmacodynamics are termed toxicokinetics and toxicodynamics in the field of ecotoxicology. Here, the focus is on toxic effects on a wide range of organisms. The corresponding models are called toxicokinetic-toxicodynamic models.

== See also ==
- Mechanism of action
- Dose-response relationship
- Pharmacokinetics
- ADME
- Antimicrobial pharmacodynamics
- Pharmaceutical company
- Schild regression
