= Channel modulator =

Type of drug which modulates ion channels

A channel modulator, or ion channel modulator, is a type of drug which modulates ion channels. They include channel blockers and channel openers.

== Direct modulators ==
Ion channels are typically categorised by gating mechanism and by the ion they conduct. Note that an ion channel may overlap between different categories. Some channels conduct multiple ion currents and some are gated by multiple mechanisms.

Examples of targets for modulators include:

Voltage-gated ion channels

- Calcium channel: see also Calcium channel blocker, Calcium channel opener
- Potassium channel: see also Potassium channel blocker, Potassium channel opener
- Sodium channel: see also Sodium channel blocker, Sodium channel opener
- Chloride channel: see also Chloride channel blocker, Chloride channel opener
- Transient receptor potential channel

Ligand gated ion channels

- 5-HT3: see also 5-HT3 antagonist,
- GABAA receptor: see also GABA receptor agonist, GABA receptor antagonist
- Glutamate receptor: see also Excitatory amino acid receptor agonist, Excitatory amino acid receptor antagonist, Ionotropic glutamate receptor, Ampakine, NMDA receptor antagonist
- Nicotinic receptor: see also Nicotinic agonist, Ganglionic blocker and Neuromuscular-blocking drug)

Ion channels gated by other mechanisms (e.g. light gated and mechanosensitive ion channels). These types of channels can also be pharmacologically modulated. For lists of the substances that pharmacologically modulate them, see their respective articles.

== Indirect modulators ==
Ion channels can also be modulated indirectly. For example with G protein coupled receptors (GPCRs), for G protein coupled inward rectifier potassium channels (GIRKs) and M channels. Ion channels can also be modulated by reuptake inhibitors and releasing agents.

== See also ==
- Receptor modulator
- Transporter modulator
