= Great St. Johnswort =

Great St. Johnswort or great St. John's wort is a common name for several plants and may refer to:

- Hypericum ascyron
- Hypericum calycinum
