= Release modulator =

Pharmaceutical

A release modulator, or neurotransmitter release modulator, is a type of drug that modulates the release of one or more neurotransmitters. Examples of release modulators include monoamine releasing agents such as the substituted amphetamines (which induce the release of norepinephrine, dopamine, and/or serotonin) and release inhibitors such as botulinum toxin A (which inhibits acetylcholine release by inactivating SNAP-25, thereby preventing exocytosis from occurring).

== See also ==
- Neuromodulation
- Reuptake modulator
- Channel modulator
- Receptor modulator
