= Choline transporter =

Protein found in humans

SLC5A7

Identifiers
- Aliases: SLC5A7, CHT, CHT1, HMN7A, hCHT, Choline transporter, solute carrier family 5 member 7, CMS20
- External IDs: OMIM: 608761; MGI: 1927126; GeneCards: SLC5A7

Gene location (Human)
Chr.	Chromosome 2 (human)
Band	2q12.3	Start	107,986,523 bp
Band	2q12.3	End	108,013,994 bp

Gene location (Mouse)
Chr.	Chromosome 17 (mouse)
Band	17|17 C	Start	54,580,618 bp
Band	17|17 C	End	54,606,062 bp
RNA expression pattern
Bgee	Human / Mouse (ortholog); Top expressed in: testicle; gonad; muscle layer of sigmoid colon; Epithelium of choroid plexus; putamen; urinary bladder; caudate nucleus; rectum; superior vestibular nucleus; smooth muscle tissue / Top expressed in: lumbar subsegment of spinal cord; habenula; superior frontal gyrus; neural layer of retina; embryo; neural tube; cerebellar cortex; facial motor nucleus; central gray substance of midbrain; Gray matter of spinal cord; More reference expression data
BioGPS	n/a
Gene ontology
Molecular function	choline:sodium symporter activity; symporter activity; choline binding; choline transmembrane transporter activity; transmembrane transporter activity
Cellular component	integral component of membrane; membrane; plasma membrane; soma; dendrite; integral component of plasma membrane; perikaryon; presynapse; axon; neuromuscular junction; cell junction; synapse
Biological process	sodium ion transport; neurotransmitter biosynthetic process; ion transport; choline transport; transmembrane transport; acetylcholine biosynthetic process; neurotransmitter secretion; synaptic transmission, cholinergic; neuromuscular synaptic transmission
Sources:Amigo / QuickGO
Orthologs
Databases	NCBI: entry; OMA: entry
Species	Human	Mouse
Entrez	60482	63993
Ensembl	ENSG00000115665	ENSMUSG00000023945
UniProt	Q9GZV3; Q2T9H3	Q8BGY9
RefSeq (mRNA)	NM_001305005; NM_001305006; NM_001305007; NM_021815	NM_022025
RefSeq (protein)	NP_001291934; NP_001291935; NP_001291936; NP_068587; NP_001291936.1	NP_071308
Location (UCSC)	Chr 2: 107.99 – 108.01 Mb	Chr 17: 54.58 – 54.61 Mb
PubMed search
- Wikidata
View/Edit Human	View/Edit Mouse

The high-affinity choline transporter (ChT) also known as solute carrier family 5 member 7 is a protein in humans that is encoded by the SLC5A7 gene. It is a cell membrane transporter and carries choline into acetylcholine-synthesizing neurons.

Hemicholinium-3 is an inhibitor of the ChT and can be used to deplete acetylcholine stores, while coluracetam is an enhancer of the ChT and can increase cholinergic neurotransmission by enhancing acetylcholine synthesis.

== Function ==
Choline is a direct precursor of acetylcholine (ACh), a neurotransmitter of the central and peripheral nervous system that regulates a variety of autonomic, cognitive, and motor functions. SLC5A7 is a Na(+)- and Cl(-)- dependent high-affinity transporter that mediates the uptake of choline for acetylcholine synthesis in cholinergic neurons.

Mutations in the SLC5A7 gene have been associated with Distal spinal muscular atrophy with vocal cord paralysis (distal hereditary motor neuropathy type 7A).

The ChT seems to be a site of action of some β-neurotoxins found in snake venoms, which disrupt peripheral cholinergic transmission by interfering with presynaptic acetylcholine synthesis. It is hypothesized that these toxins irreversibly block the ChT.

== Choline transporter in the human brain microvascular endothelial cells ==
Choline is a necessary reagent for the synthesis of acetylcholine in the central nervous system. Neurons get their choline by specific protein transporters known as choline transporters. In the human brain microvascular endothelial cells, two systems initiate the choline absorption. The first system is known as the Choline transporter-like protein 1, or CTL1. The second system is the Choline transporter-like protein 2, or CTL2. Those two systems are found on the plasma membrane of the brain microvascular endothelial cells. They are also found on the mitochondrial membrane. CTL2 was found to be highly expressed on the mitochondria. Meanwhile, CTL1 was mostly found on the plasma membrane of those microvascular cells.

CTL2 is the main protein involved in the absorption of choline into the mitochondria for its oxidation, and CTL1 is the main protein for the choline uptake from the extracellular medium. CTL1 is a pH dependent protein. The absorption of choline through CTL1 proteins changes with the pH of the extracellular medium. When the pH of the medium is changed from 7.5 to 7.0-5.5, the rate of absorption of choline by CTL1 proteins decreases greatly. The choline uptake does not change upon the alkalinization of the extracellular medium. Moreover, it was found that the choline uptake is also influenced by the electronegativity of the plasma membrane. When the concentration of potassium ions is increased, the membrane becomes depolarized. The choline absorption decreases majorly as a result of the membrane depolarization by the potassium ions. The choline uptake was found to be only affected by the potassium ions. The sodium ions do not affect the affinity of CTL1 and CTL2 to choline.

== See also ==
- Vesicular acetylcholine transporter (VAChT)
