= GBR-13119 =

Names
- Preferred IUPAC name 1-[2-(Diphenylmethoxy)ethyl]-4-[3-(4-fluorophenyl)propyl]piperazine

Identifiers
CAS Number	76778-23-9
3D model (JSmol)	Interactive image
ChEMBL	ChEMBL288914
ChemSpider	116058
PubChem CID	131286
CompTox Dashboard (EPA)	DTXSID30227586
- InChI: InChI=1S/C28H33FN2O/c29-27-15-13-24(14-16-27)8-7-17-30-18-20-31(21-19-30)22-23-32-28(25-9-3-1-4-10-25)26-11-5-2-6-12-26/h1-6,9-16,28H,7-8,17-23H2 Key: IYWFOWPCJVOCMB-UHFFFAOYSA-N; InChI=1/C28H33FN2O/c29-27-15-13-24(14-16-27)8-7-17-30-18-20-31(21-19-30)22-23-32-28(25-9-3-1-4-10-25)26-11-5-2-6-12-26/h1-6,9-16,28H,7-8,17-23H2 Key: IYWFOWPCJVOCMB-UHFFFAOYAU
- SMILES: C1CN(CCN1CCCC2=CC=C(C=C2)F)CCOC(C3=CC=CC=C3)C4=CC=CC=C4

Properties
Chemical formula	C_{28}H_{33}FN_{2}O
Molar mass	432.583 g·mol^{−1}
- Except where otherwise noted, data are given for materials in their standard state (at 25 °C [77 °F], 100 kPa). Infobox references

GBR-13119 is a psychostimulant and dopamine re-uptake inhibitor.
