= C19H23N3O3 =

The molecular formula C_{19}H_{23}N_{3}O_{3} (molar mass: 341.40 g/mol, exact mass: 341.1739 u) may refer to:

- Naloxazone
- Coluracetam
