= C6H4N4 =

The molecular formula C_{6}H_{4}N_{4} (molar mass: 132.12 g/mol, exact mass: 132.0436 u) may refer to:

- Pteridine
- Tricyanoaminopropene (TRIAP)
