= Reuptake modulator =

Type of pharmaceutical drug

A reuptake modulator, or transporter modulator, is a type of drug which modulates the reuptake of one or more neurotransmitters via their respective neurotransmitter transporters. Examples of reuptake modulators include reuptake inhibitors (transporter blockers) and reuptake enhancers.

== See also ==
- Releasing agent
- Release modulator
- Transporter substrate
- Channel modulator
- Receptor modulator
- SSRI
