= Reuptake enhancer =

Drug that makes neurotransmitter transporters more active

Coluracetam, a high-affinity choline uptake (HACU) enhancer

A reuptake enhancer (RE), also sometimes referred to as a reuptake activator, is a type of reuptake modulator which enhances the plasmalemmal transporter-mediated reuptake of a neurotransmitter from the synapse into the pre-synaptic neuron, leading to a decrease in the extracellular concentrations of the neurotransmitter and therefore a decrease in neurotransmission.

The antidepressant tianeptine was once claimed to be a (selective) serotonin reuptake enhancer (SRE or SSRE), but the role of serotonin reuptake in its mechanism is doubtful. Tianeptine has no affinity for the serotonin transporter, neither increases nor decreases extracellular levels of serotonin in cortico-limbic structures of conscious rats, and it didn't show any other long-term effect on the serotonin pathway. Ultimately, tianeptine was determined to be a selective mu opioid receptor agonist.

Coluracetam is a choline-reuptake enhancer. The flavone luteoline as well as some of its derivatives enhance the reuptake at the dopamine transporter, extracts of Caulis Sinomenii activate DA/NE transporters.

== See also ==
- Reuptake inhibitor (RI)
- Releasing agent (RA)
- Serotonin modulator and stimulator (SMS), another term tentatively created to describe the action of a specific drug
