= Hemicholinium-3 =

Chemical compound

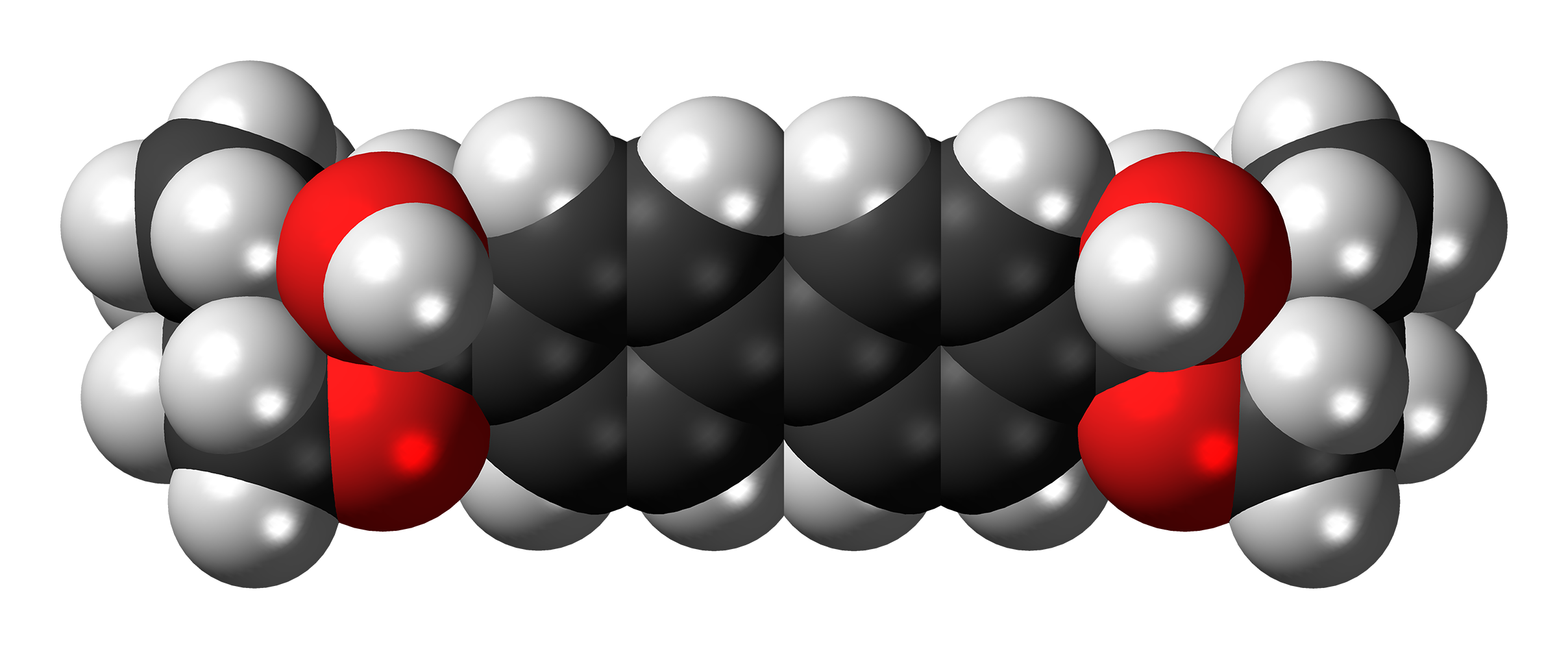

Clinical data
- Other names: 2-[4-[4-(2-hydroxy-4,4-dimethylmorpholin-4-ium-2-yl)phenyl]phenyl]-4,4-dimethylmorpholin-4-ium-2-ol
- ATC code: None

Identifiers
- IUPAC name: (2S,2S)-2,2'-biphenyl-4,4'-diylbis(2-hydroxy-4,4-dimethylmorpholin-4-ium)
- CAS Number: 312-45-8
- PubChem CID: 9399
- IUPHAR/BPS: 4493
- ChemSpider: 9029
- UNII: 65NY3I7ZD0
- ChEMBL: ChEMBL268697
- CompTox Dashboard (EPA): DTXSID80883358
- ECHA InfoCard: 100.005.663

Chemical and physical data
- Formula: C_{24}H_{34}N_{2}O_{4}^{2+}
- Molar mass: 414.546 g·mol^{−1}
- 3D model (JSmol): Interactive image
- SMILES: [Br-].[Br-].OC1(OCC[N+](C)(C)C1)c2ccc(cc2)c3ccc(cc3)C4(O)OCC[N+](C)(C)C4
- InChI: InChI=1S/C24H34N2O4.2BrH/c1-25(2)13-15-29-23(27,17-25)21-9-5-19(6-10-21)20-7-11-22(12-8-20)24(28)18-26(3,4)14-16-30-24;;/h5-12,27-28H,13-18H2,1-4H3;2*1H/q+2;;/p-2; Key:OPYKHUMNFAMIBL-UHFFFAOYSA-L

Hemicholinium-3 (HC3), also known as hemicholine, is a drug which blocks the reuptake of choline by the high-affinity choline transporter (ChT; encoded in humans by the gene SLC5A7) at the presynapse. The reuptake of choline is the rate-limiting step in the synthesis of acetylcholine; hence, hemicholinium-3 decreases the synthesis of acetylcholine. It is therefore classified as an indirect acetylcholine antagonist.

Acetylcholine is synthesized from choline and a donated acetyl group from acetyl-CoA, by the action of choline acetyltransferase (ChAT). Thus, decreasing the amount of choline available to a neuron will decrease the amount of acetylcholine produced. Neurons affected by hemicholinium-3 must rely on the transport of choline from the soma (cell body), rather than relying on reuptake of choline from the synaptic cleft.

== Toxicity ==
Hemicholinium-3 is highly toxic because it interferes with cholinergic neurotransmission. The LD_{50} of hemicholinium-3 for mice is about 35 μg.

== See also ==
- Triethylcholine
- Vesamicol
