= Channel blocker =

Molecule able to block protein channels, frequently used as pharmaceutical

Tetrodotoxin, an example of a channel block molecule.

A channel blocker is the biological mechanism in which a particular molecule is used to prevent the opening of ion channels in order to produce a physiological response in a cell. Channel blocking is conducted by different types of molecules, such as cations, anions, amino acids, and other chemicals. These blockers act as ion channel antagonists, preventing the response that is normally provided by the opening of the channel.

Ion channels permit the selective passage of ions through cell membranes by utilizing proteins that function as pores, which allow for the passage of electrical charge in and out of the cell. These ion channels are most often gated, meaning they require a specific stimulus to cause the channel to open and close. These ion channel types regulate the flow of charged ions across the membrane and therefore mediate membrane potential of the cell.

Molecules that act as channel blockers are important in the field of pharmacology, as a large portion of drug design is the use of ion channel antagonists in regulating physiological response. The specificity of channel block molecules on certain channels makes it a valuable tool in the treatment of numerous disorders.

== Background ==
=== Ion channels ===
Example of voltage-dependent potassium ion channel in relation to changing ion concentrations

To comprehend the mechanism of channel blockers, it is critical to understand the composition of ion channels. Their main function is to contribute to the resting membrane potential of a cell via the flow of ions through a cell membrane. To accomplish this task, ions must be able to cross the hydrophobic region of a lipid bilayer membrane, an unfavorable process. To assist in ion transport, ion channels form a hydrophilic pore through the membrane which allows for the usually unfavorable transfer of hydrophilic molecules. Various ion channels have varying mechanisms of function. They include:

- voltage-gated ion channels
  - Ion channels that are activated by changes in membrane potential
- ligand-gated ion channel
  - Ion channels mediated by the binding of a ligand to the channel protein
- mechanosensitive ion channels
  - Ion channels that respond to stretch, vibration, or temperature changes
- light-gated ion channels
  - Ion channels that open or close in response to light

Molecules that act as ion channel blockers can be used in relation to any of these various channels. For example, sodium channels, which are essential to the production of action potentials, are affected by many different toxins. Tetrodotoxin (TTX), a toxin found in pufferfish, completely blocks sodium ion transportation by blocking the selectivity filter region of the channel. Much of the structure of the pores of ion channels has been elucidated from studies that used toxins to inhibit channel function.

=== Identity ===
Tools such as X-ray crystallography and electrophysiology have been essential in locating the binding sites of open channel block molecules. By studying the biological and chemical makeup of ion channels, researchers can determine the makeup of the molecules that bind to certain regions. X-ray crystallography provides a structural image of the channel and molecule in question. Determining the hydrophobicity of channel domains through hydrophobicity plots also provides clues to the chemical makeup of the molecule and why it binds to a certain region. For example, if a protein binds to a hydrophobic region of the channel (and therefore, has a transmembrane region), the molecule in question might be composed of the amino acids alanine, leucine, or phenylalanine, as they are all hydrophobic themselves. Electrophysiology is also an important tool in identifying channel structure, as analyzing the ionic factors that lead to channel activation can be critical to understanding the inhibiting actions of open channel block molecules.

== Physiology ==
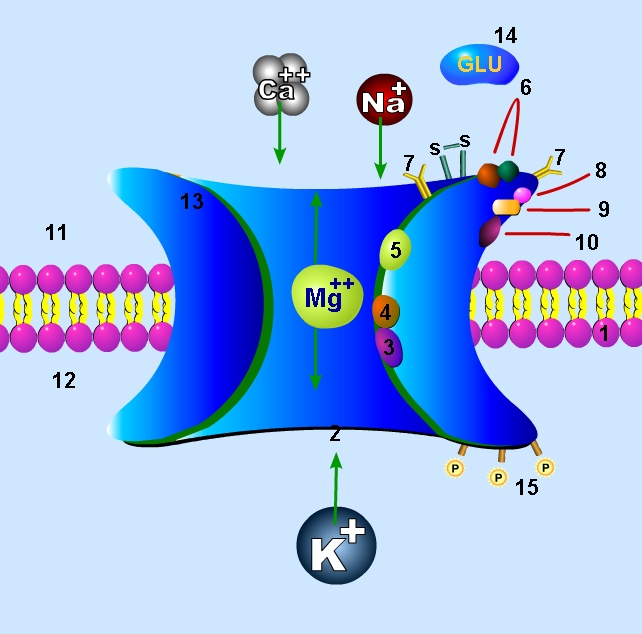
This diagram of a NMDA receptor shows the binding points for a diverse array of molecules which can affect the receptor function. Legend: 1. Cell membrane 2. Channel blocked by Mg^{2+} at the block site (3) 3. Block site by Mg^{2+} 4. Hallucinogen compounds binding site 5. Binding site for Zn^{2+} 6. Binding site for agonists(glutamate) and/or antagonist ligands(APV) 7. Glycosylation sites 8. Proton binding sites 9. Glycine binding sites 10. Polyamines binding site 11. Extracellular space 12. Intracellular space

=== Receptor antagonist ===
Channel blockers are antagonists for the respective ion channels. Many channels have binding spots for regulatory elements which can promote or repress normal function depending on the requirements within the cell and organism. The normal function of agonist binding is the generation of cellular changes leading to various downstream effects; these effects range from altering membrane potential to initiation of signaling cascades. Conversely, when open channel blockers bind to the cell they prevent the normal function of agonist binding. For example, voltage-gated channels open and close based on membrane potential and are critical in the generation of action potentials by their allowance of ions to flow down established gradients. However, open channel blockers can bind to these channels to prevent ions from flowing, thus inhibiting the initiation of an action potential.

=== Specificity of molecules ===
Many different organic compounds can act as channel blockers despite channel specificity. Channels have evolved structures that, due to their membrane spanning regions, can discriminate between various ions or compounds. For example, some objects are too large for to fit into channels that are structurally specified to transport smaller objects, such as a potassium ion attempting to fit into a sodium channel. Conversely, some objects are too small to be properly stabilized by certain channel pores, such as a sodium ion attempting to pass through a potassium channel. In both cases, channel flux is not permitted. However, as long as a particular compound possesses adequate chemical affinity to a channel, that compound may be able to bind and block the channel pore. For example, TTX can bind and inactivate voltage-gated sodium channels, despite the fact that TTX is much larger and chemically different than sodium ions. Given the disparities in size and chemical properties between TTX and a sodium ion, this is an example of structure being used to block usually specific channels.

=== Kinetics ===
A channel block can be induced by many different types of organic compounds as long as they can bind to some portion of the target channel's pore. The kinetics of channel blockers are primarily understood though their use as anesthetics. Local anesthetics work by inducing a phasic block state in the targeted neurons. Initially, open channel blockers do not effectively prevent action potentials, as few channels are blocked and the blocker itself can be released from the channel either quickly or slowly depending on its characteristics. However, phasic blocks occur as repeated depolarization increases blockers' affinity for channels in the neuron. The combination of an increase in available channels and the change in channel conformation to increase blocker binding affinity are responsible for this action.

== Clinical significance ==
=== Therapeutic uses ===
Various neurodegenerative diseases have been associated with excessive NMDA receptor activation meant to mediate calcium dependent neurotoxicity. Researchers have examined many different NMDA antagonists and their therapeutic efficacy, none of which have concluded to be both safe and effective. For years, researchers have been investigating the effects of an open channel block, memantine, as a treatment option for neurotoxicity. They have hypothesized that the faster blocking and unblocking rates, and overall kinetics, of memantine could be the underlying reason for the clinical tolerance. As an uncompetitive antagonist, memantine should bring NMDA levels close to normal despite high glutamate concentration. Based on this information, researchers have speculated that someday memantine could be used as an open channel block to prevent increasing glutamate levels associated with neurotoxicity with few to no side effects compared to other treatment options.

==== Alzheimer's disease ====
Alzheimer's disease, a specific neurodegenerative disorder, is linked to glutaminergic neurotransmission interruptions that are believed to result in the staple cognitive symptoms of Alzheimer's. Researchers suggest that noncompetitive NMDA receptor agonists can be used to aid in the management of these symptoms without producing severe side effects. As one of the only drugs approved for Alzheimer's treatment, memantine has been shown to allow excitatory post-synaptic currents to remain unaffected while decreasing the incidence and amplitude of inhibitory post-synaptic currents. Evidence supports the hypothesis that both the strong voltage dependency and fast kinetics of memantine may be responsible for the decreased side effects and cognitive progress.

==== Cystic fibrosis ====
Cystic fibrosis is a progressive, genetic disease that is linked to CF transmembrane regulator (CFTR) dysfunction. Blockage of this channel by certain cytoplasmic, negatively-charged substances results in reduced chloride ion and bicarbonate anion transport, as well as reduced fluid and salt secretion. This results in a buildup of thick mucus, which is characteristic of cystic fibrosis.

=== Pharmacology ===
==== Anesthetics ====
Channel blockers are essential in the field of anesthetics. Sodium channel inhibitors are used as both antiepileptics and antiarrhythmics, as they can inhibit the hyper-excitable tissues in a patient. Introducing specific sodium channel blockers into a tissue allows for the preferential binding of the blocker to sodium channels, which results in an ultimate inhibition of the flow of sodium into the tissue. Over time, this mechanism leads to an overall decrease in tissue excitation. Prolonged hyperpolarization interrupts normal channel recovery and allows for constant inhibition, providing dynamic control of the anesthetics in a given setting.

==== Alzheimer's disease ====
Excessive exposure to glutamate leads to neurotoxicity in patients with Alzheimer's disease. Specifically, over-activation of NMDA-type glutamate receptors have been linked to neural cell excitotoxicity and cell death. A potential solution to this is a decrease in NMDA receptor activity, without interfering so drastically as to cause clinical side effects.

In an attempt to prevent further neurodegeneration, researchers have used memantine, an open channel block, as a form of treatment. Thus far, the use of memantine in patients with Alzheimer's disease quickly results in clinical progress across many different symptoms. Memantine is thought to work effectively due to its ability to quickly modify its kinetics, which prevents buildup in the channel and allows normal synaptic transmission. Other channel blockers have been found to block all NMDA receptor activity, leading to adverse clinical side effects.

==== CFTR channel dysfunction ====
Cystic Fibrosis transmembrane regulators (CFTRs) function in chloride ion, bicarbonate anion, and fluid transport. They are expressed primarily in apical membranes of epithelial cells in respiratory, pancreatic, gastrointestinal, and reproductive tissues. Abnormally-elevated CFTR function results in excessive fluid secretion. High-affinity CFTR inhibitors, such as CFTR_{inh}-172 and GlyH-101, have been shown to be efficient in treatment of secretory diarrheas. Theoretically, CFTR channel blockers may also be useful as male contraceptives. CFTR channels mediate bicarbonate anion entry which is essential for sperm capacitation.

Various types of substances have been known to block CFTR chloride ion channels. Some of the best-known and studied substances include sulfonylureas, arylaminobenzenoates, and disulfonic stilbenes. These blockers are side-dependent as they enter the pore exclusively from the cytoplasmic side, voltage-dependent as hyperpolarized membrane potentials favor negatively-charged substance entry into the pore from the cytoplasmic side, and chloride ion concentration-dependent as high extracellular chloride ions electrostatically repel negatively-charged blockers back into the cytoplasm.

== Types ==
There are several different major classes of channel blockers, including:

- Calcium (Ca^{2+}) channel blockers
- Chloride (Cl^{−}) channel blockers
- Potassium (K^{+}) channel blockers
- Sodium (Na^{+}) channel blockers

The following types which act on ligand-gated ion channels (LGICs) via binding to their pore also exist:

- 5-HT_{3} receptor antagonists
- GABA_{A} receptor antagonists
- nACh receptor antagonists
- NMDA receptor antagonists

Channel blockers are also known to act at AMPA receptors, Glycine receptors, Kainate receptors, P2X receptors and Zinc (Zn^{2+})-activated channels. The type of inhibition mediated by channel blockers may be referred to as noncompetitive or uncompetitive.

== See also ==
- Ion channel
- Channel opener
