= Hopp–Woods scale =

Ranking of water solubility for amino acids

The Hopp–Woods hydrophilicity scale of amino acids is a method of ranking the amino acids in a protein according to their water solubility in order to search for surface locations on proteins, and especially those locations that tend to form strong interactions with other macromolecules such as proteins, DNA, and RNA.

Given the amino acid sequence of any protein, likely interaction sites can be identified by taking the moving average of six amino acid hydrophilicity values along the polypeptide chain, and looking for local peaks in the data plot.

In subsequent papers after their initial publication of the method, Hopp and Woods demonstrated that the data plots, or hydrophilicity profiles, contained much information about protein folding, and that the hydrophobic valleys of the profiles corresponded to internal structures of proteins such as beta-strands and alpha-helices. Furthermore, long hydrophobic valleys were shown to correspond quite closely to the membrane-spanning helices identified by the later-published Kyte and Doolittle hydropathic plotting method.
