= Channel opener =

A channel opener, also known as a channel activator, is a type of drug which facilitates ion flow through ion channels.

They include the following:

- Potassium channel openers
- Calcium channel openers
- Sodium channel openers
- Chloride channel openers

== See also ==
- Channel blocker
