= Hyperforin =

Chemical compound

Clinical data
- Dependence liability: None
- Routes of administration: Oral
- Drug class: Monoamine reuptake inhibitor, psychic energizer
- ATC code: none

Legal status
- Legal status: UK: General sales list (GSL, OTC); US: OTC; unscheduled in most countries, with the notable exception of Ireland (Rx-only)

Pharmacokinetic data
- Metabolism: Hepatic and CYP3A & CYP2B

Identifiers
- IUPAC name: (1R,5S,6R,7S)-4-Hydroxy-6-methyl-1,3,7-tris(3-methylbut-2-en-1-yl)-6-(4-methylpent-3-en-1-yl)-5-(2-methylpropanoyl)bicyclo[3.3.1]non-3-ene-2,9-dion
- CAS Number: 11079-53-1
- PubChem CID: 114787
- IUPHAR/BPS: 2764
- DrugBank: DB01892
- ChemSpider: 16736597
- UNII: RM741E34FP
- KEGG: C07608
- ChEBI: CHEBI:5834
- CompTox Dashboard (EPA): DTXSID90891409
- ECHA InfoCard: 100.112.565

Chemical and physical data
- Formula: C_{35}H_{52}O_{4}
- Molar mass: 536.797 g·mol^{−1}
- 3D model (JSmol): Interactive image
- Melting point: 79–80 °C (174–176 °F)
- Solubility in water: 0.66 mg/mL (20 °C)
- SMILES: CC(C)C(=O)[C@@]21C(=O)[C@@](C[C@H](C\C=C(/C)C)[C@@]1(C)CC\C=C(/C)C)(C\C=C(/C)C)C(=O)C(\C\C=C(/C)C)=C2\O
- InChI: InChI=1S/C35H52O4/c1-22(2)13-12-19-33(11)27(16-14-23(3)4)21-34(20-18-25(7)8)30(37)28(17-15-24(5)6)31(38)35(33,32(34)39)29(36)26(9)10/h13-15,18,26-27,38H,12,16-17,19-21H2,1-11H3/t27-,33+,34+,35-/m0/s1; Key:IWBJJCOKGLUQIZ-HQKKAZOISA-N

Hyperforin is a phytochemical produced by some of the members of the plant genus Hypericum, notably Hypericum perforatum (St John's wort). Hyperforin may be involved in the pharmacological effects of St. John's wort, specifically in its antidepressant effects. Meta-analyses of clinical trials suggest that H. perforatum is as effective as SSRIs for treating mild to moderate depression and is better tolerated, although findings are limited by short study durations.

Hyperforin is found in significant amounts only in H. perforatum, where it accumulates as a probable plant defense compound, with modern carbon dioxide extraction methods used to isolate it from mixtures containing related compounds like adhyperforin.

== Occurrence ==
Hyperforin has only been found in significant amounts in Hypericum perforatum with other related species such as Hypericum calycinum containing lower levels of the phytochemical. It accumulates in oil glands, pistils, and fruits, probably as a plant defensive compound. The first natural extractions were done with ethanol and afforded a 7:1 yield of crude extract to phytochemical; however, this technique produced a mixture of hyperforin and adhyperforin. The extraction technique has since been modernized using lipophilic liquid CO_{2} extraction to afford a 3:1 crude to phytochemical extraction which is then further purified away from adhyperforin. This CO_{2} extraction is rather tricky still because typical 'supercritical' conditions extract less material whereas anything over 40 °C (100 °F) will degrade hyperforin. Other Hypericum species contain low amounts of hyperforin.

== Chemistry ==
Hyperforin is a prenylated phloroglucinol derivative and is a member of the polycyclic polyprenylated acylphloroglucinol family, also known as the PPAP family. Hyperforin is a unique PPAP because it consists of a C8 quaternary stereocenter which was a synthetic challenge unlike other PPAP synthetic targets. The structure of hyperforin was elucidated by a research group from the Shemyakin Institute of Bio-organic Chemistry (USSR Academy of Sciences in Moscow) and published in 1975. A total synthesis of the non-natural hyperforin enantiomer was reported in 2010 which required approximately 50 synthetic transformations. In 2010, an enantioselective total synthesis of the correct enantiomer was disclosed. The retrosynthetic analysis was inspired by hyperforin's structural symmetry and biosynthetic pathway. The synthetic route undertaken generated a prostereogenic intermediate which then established the synthetically challenging C8 stereocenter and facilitated the stereochemical outcomes for the remainder of the synthesis.

Hyperforin is unstable in the presence of light and oxygen. Frequent oxidized forms contain a C3 to C9 hemiketal/heterocyclic bridge or will form furan/pyran derivatives.

== Pharmacokinetics ==
Some pharmacokinetic data on hyperforin is available for an extract containing 5% hyperforin. Maximal plasma levels (C_{max}) in human volunteers were reached 3–4 hours after administration of an extract containing 14.8 mg hyperforin. Biological half-life (t_{1/2}) and mean residence time were 9 hours and 12 hours, respectively, with an estimated steady state plasma concentration of 100 ng/mL (approx. 180 nM) for 3 doses per day. Linear plasma concentrations were observed within a normal dosage range and no accumulation occurred.

In healthy male volunteers, 612 mg dry extract of St. John's wort produced hyperforin pharmacokinetics characterized by a half-life of 19.64 hours.

== Pharmacodynamics ==
Hyperforin may be a constituent responsible for the antidepressant and anxiolytic properties of extracts of St. John's wort. In vitro, it acted as a reuptake inhibitor of monoamines (MRI) (particularly of serotonin, norepinephrine, dopamine) and of GABA and glutamate, with IC_{50} values of 0.05–0.10 μg/mL for all compounds, with the exception of glutamate, which is in the 0.5 μg/mL range. In other laboratory studies, hyperforin induced cytochrome P450 enzymes CYP3A4 and CYP2C9 by binding to and activating the pregnane X receptor.

Reuptake inhibition
Neurotransmitter	IC_{50} (nanomoles)
Norepinephrine	80 ± 24
Dopamine	102 ± 19
GABA	184 ± 41
5-HT	205 ± 45
Glutamate	829 ± 687
Choline	8500

Binding affinity (human receptors)
Receptor	Ki (nanomoles)
D1	595.8

== Biosynthesis ==
Current research focuses on understanding the biosynthesis of hyperforin and applying advanced techniques like omics, genome editing, and synthetic biology to enhance their pharmaceutical and medical uses.

It faces production challenges that biotechnological methods, such as specialized plant root cultures and microbial biosynthesis, are being developed to overcome for scalable and modifiable manufacturing.

Natural and semi-synthetic analogues of hyperforin

Adhyperforin

Aristoforin

Hyperforin trimethoxybenzoate

Tetrahydrohyperforin

Hyperforin nicotinate

== Antidepressant research ==
Two meta-analyses of preliminary clinical trials evaluating the efficacy of St. John's wort for treating mild-to-moderate depression indicated a response similar to selective serotonin reuptake inhibitors and with better tolerance, although the long-term generalization of study results was limited by the short duration (4–12 weeks) of reviewed studies.

== See also ==
- Hypericin
