= Coluracetam =

Chemical compound

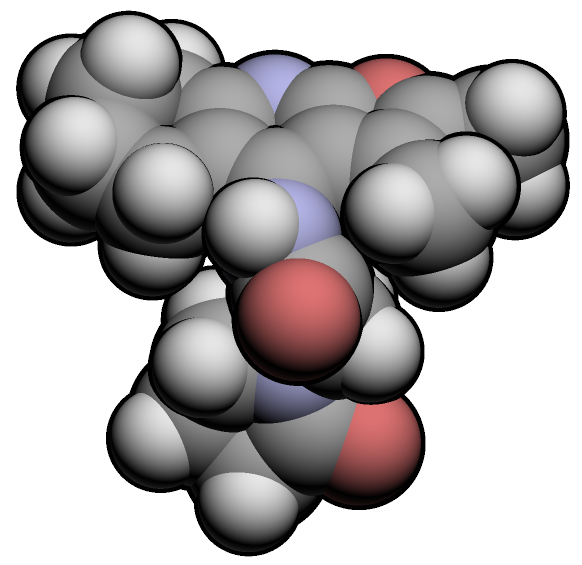

Clinical data
- ATC code: None

Legal status
- Legal status: AU: S4 (Prescription only); US: Not FDA approved

Identifiers
- IUPAC name: N-(2,3-Dimethyl-5,6,7,8-tetrahydrofuro[2,3-b]quinolin-4-yl)-2-(2-oxo-1-pyrrolidinyl)acetamide
- CAS Number: 135463-81-9
- PubChem CID: 214346
- ChemSpider: 185836
- UNII: V6FL6O5GR7
- CompTox Dashboard (EPA): DTXSID60159386

Chemical and physical data
- Formula: C_{19}H_{23}N_{3}O_{3}
- Molar mass: 341.411 g·mol^{−1}
- 3D model (JSmol): Interactive image
- SMILES: Cc1c(oc2c1c(c3c(n2)CCCC3)NC(=O)CN4CCCC4=O)C
- InChI: InChI=1S/C19H23N3O3/c1-11-12(2)25-19-17(11)18(13-6-3-4-7-14(13)20-19)21-15(23)10-22-9-5-8-16(22)24/h3-10H2,1-2H3,(H,20,21,23); Key:PSPGQHXMUKWNDI-UHFFFAOYSA-N

Coluracetam (INN; development code BCI-540; formerly MKC-231) is a purported nootropic agent of the racetam family. It contains a chemical group that is a bioisostere of the 9-amino-tetrahydroacridine family. It was initially developed and tested by the Mitsubishi Tanabe Pharma Corporation for Alzheimer's disease. After the drug failed to reach endpoints in its clinical trials it was in-licensed by BrainCells Inc for investigations into major depressive disorder (MDD), which was preceded by being awarded a "Qualifying Therapeutic Discovery Program Grant" by the state of California. Findings from phase IIa clinical trials have suggested that it would be a potential medication for comorbid MDD with generalized anxiety disorder (GAD). BrainCells Inc is currently out-licensing the drug for this purpose. It may also have potential use in prevention and treatment of ischemic retinopathy and retinal and optic nerve injury.

Coluracetam has been shown to reverse the loss of choline acetyltransferase production in the medial septal nucleus of rats exposed to phencyclidine (PCP), and is considered a potential therapeutic drug for schizophrenia.

The drug has been sold online as a nootropic. It is anecdotally claimed to produce visual effects such as improved color, slight synaesthesia, and an "HD visual effect", analogously to sub-hallucinogenic dose of the serotonergic psychedelic psilocybin. Other purported effects include enhanced mood and reduced anxiety.

== Pharmacology ==
=== Mechanism of action ===
Coluracetam enhances high-affinity choline uptake (HACU), which is the rate-limiting step of acetylcholine (ACh) synthesis. Studies have shown coluracetam to improve learning impairment on a single oral dose given to rats which have been exposed to cholinergic neurotoxins. Subsequent studies have shown that it may induce long-lasting procognitive effects in cholinergic neurotoxin-treated rats by changing the choline transporter regulation system.

== Society and culture ==
=== Legal status ===
==== Australia ====
Coluracetam is a schedule 4 substance in Australia under the Poisons Standard (February 2020). A schedule 4 substance is classified as "Prescription Only Medicine, or Prescription Animal Remedy – Substances, the use or supply of which should be by or on the order of persons permitted by State or Territory legislation to prescribe and should be available from a pharmacist on prescription."

== See also ==
- Piracetam
- Tricyanoaminopropene
