= Reuptake inhibitor =

Type of drug

Escitalopram, a selective serotonin reuptake inhibitor (SSRI) used as an antidepressant.

Reuptake inhibitors (RIs) are a type of reuptake modulators. It is a drug that inhibits the plasmalemmal transporter-mediated reuptake of a neurotransmitter from the synapse into the pre-synaptic neuron. This leads to an increase in extracellular concentrations of the neurotransmitter and an increase in neurotransmission. Various drugs exert their psychological and physiological effects through reuptake inhibition, including many antidepressants and psychostimulants.

Most known reuptake inhibitors affect the monoamine neurotransmitters serotonin, norepinephrine (and epinephrine), and dopamine. However, there are also a number of pharmaceuticals and research chemicals that act as reuptake inhibitors for other neurotransmitters such as glutamate, γ-aminobutyric acid (GABA), glycine, adenosine, choline (the precursor of acetylcholine), and the endocannabinoids, among others.

== Mechanism of action ==
=== Active site transporter substrates ===
Tiagabine, a selective GABA reuptake inhibitor used as an anticonvulsant in the treatment of epilepsy and seizures.

Standard reuptake inhibitors are believed to act simply as competitive substrates that work by binding directly to the plasmalemma transporter of the neurotransmitter in question. They occupy the transporter in place of the respective neurotransmitter and competitively block it from being transported from the nerve terminal or synapse into the pre-synaptic neuron. With high enough doses, occupation becomes as much as 80–90%. At this level of inhibition, the transporter will be considerably less efficient at removing excess d from the synapse and this causes a substantial increase in the extracellular concentrations of the neurotransmitter and therefore an increase in overall neurotransmission.

=== Allosteric site transporter substrates ===
Alternatively, some reuptake inhibitors bind to allosteric sites and inhibit reuptake indirectly and noncompetitively.

Phencyclidine and related drugs such as benocyclidine, tenocyclidine, ketamine, and dizocilpine (MK-801), have been shown to inhibit the reuptake of the monoamine neurotransmitters. They appear to exert their reuptake inhibition by binding to vaguely characterized allosteric sites on each of the respective monoamine transporters. Benztropine, mazindol, and vanoxerine also bind to these sites and have similar properties. In addition to their high affinity for the main site of the monoamine transporters, several competitive transporter substrates such as cocaine and indatraline have lower affinity for these allosteric sites as well.

A few of the selective serotonin reuptake inhibitors (SSRIs) such as the dextro-enantiomer of citalopram appear to be allosteric reuptake inhibitors of serotonin. Instead of binding to the active site on the serotonin transporter, they bind to an allosteric site, which exerts its effects by causing conformational changes in the transporter protein and thereby modulating the affinity of substrates for the active site. As a result, escitalopram has been marketed as an allosteric serotonin reuptake inhibitor. Notably, this allosteric site may be directly related to the above-mentioned PCP binding sites.

=== Vesicular transporter substrates ===
Reserpine, a vesicular reuptake inhibitor that was used in the past to deplete serotonin, norepinephrine, and dopamine stores as an antipsychotic and antihypertensive. It was notorious for causing anxiety and depression, and as a result, was replaced by newer, more modern drugs instead.

A second type of reuptake inhibition affects vesicular transport, and inhibits the intracellular transport of neurotransmitters into cytoplasmic vesicles. In contrast to plasmalemmal reuptake inhibitors, vesicular reuptake inhibitors do not increase the synaptic concentrations of a neurotransmitter, only the cytoplasmic concentrations; unless, that is, they also act as plasmalemmal transporter reversers, also known as releasing agents. Pure vesicular reuptake inhibitors tend to actually lower synaptic neurotransmitter concentrations, as blocking the repackaging of, and storage of the neurotransmitter in question leaves them vulnerable to degradation via enzymes such as monoamine oxidase (MAO) that exist in the cytoplasm. With vesicular transport blocked, neurotransmitter stores can become depleted.

Reserpine (Serpasil) is an irreversible inhibitor of the vesicular monoamine transporter 2 (VMAT2), and is a prototypical example of a vesicular reuptake inhibitor.

=== Indirect unknown mechanism ===
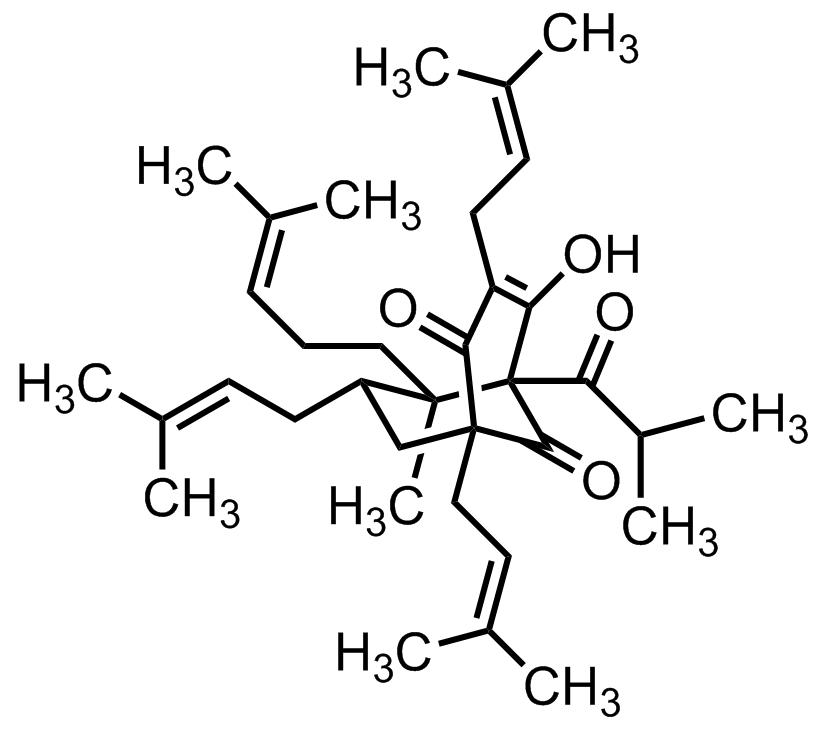
Hyperforin, the primary active constituent responsible for the therapeutic benefits of extracts of the herb Hypericum perforatum (St. John's Wort), which is used as an antidepressant.

Two of the primary active constituents of the medicinal herb Hypericum perforatum (St. John's Wort) are hyperforin and adhyperforin. Hyperforin and adhyperforin are wide-spectrum inhibitors of the reuptake of serotonin, norepinephrine, dopamine, glutamate, GABA, glycine, and choline, and they exert these effects by binding to and activating the transient receptor potential cation channel TRPC6. Activation of TRPC6 induces the entry of calcium (Ca^{2+}) and sodium (Na^{+}) into the cell, which causes the effect through unknown mechanism.

== Types ==
=== Typical ===
- Amino acid reuptake inhibitor
  - Excitatory amino acid reuptake inhibitor (or glutamate-aspartate reuptake inhibitor)
  - GABA reuptake inhibitor
  - Glycine reuptake inhibitor
- Monoamine reuptake inhibitor
  - Dopamine reuptake inhibitor
  - Norepinephrine reuptake inhibitor
  - Serotonin reuptake inhibitor
  - Serotonin-norepinephrine reuptake inhibitor
  - Norepinephrine-dopamine reuptake inhibitor
  - Serotonin-dopamine reuptake inhibitor
  - Serotonin-norepinephrine-dopamine reuptake inhibitor
- Miscellaneous
  - Adenosine reuptake inhibitor
  - Endocannabinoid reuptake inhibitor

=== Atypical ===
- TRPC6 activators (wide-spectrum reuptake inhibitors) – hyperforin, adhyperforin

=== Plasmalemmal ===
- Choline reuptake inhibitor – hemicholinium-3, triethylcholine

=== Vesicular ===
- Vesicular acetylcholine transporter (VAChT) inhibitor – vesamicol
- Vesicular monoamine transporter (VMAT) inhibitor – reserpine, tetrabenazine

== See also ==
- Releasing agent
