= Triethylcholine =

Chemical compound

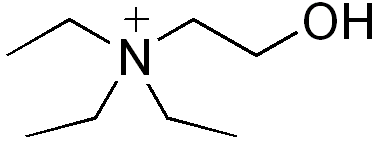

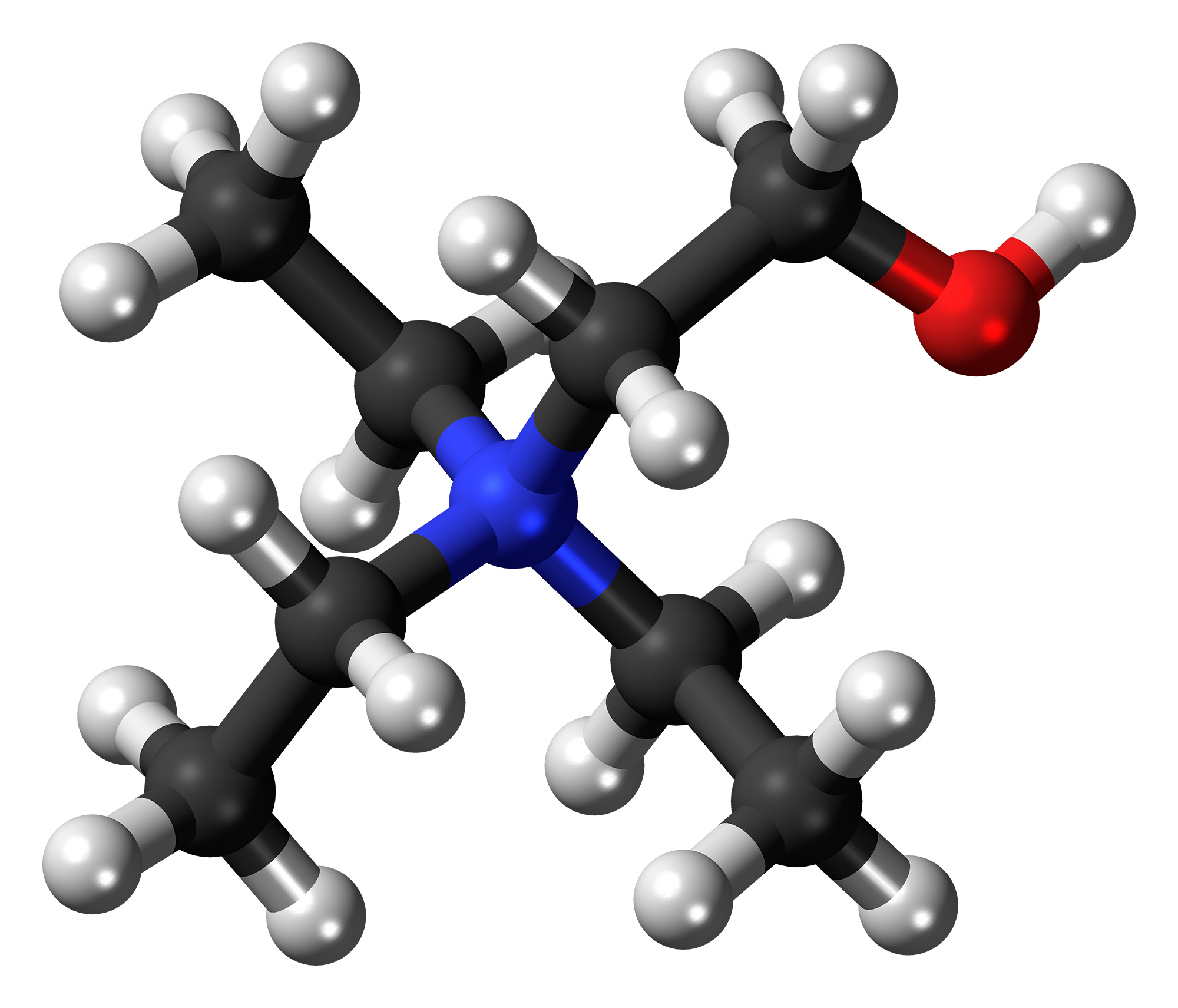

Clinical data
- ATC code: None

Identifiers
- IUPAC name: N,N,N-triethyl-2-hydroxyethanaminium
- CAS Number: 302-61-4
- PubChem CID: 80058
- IUPHAR/BPS: 4760
- ChemSpider: 72310
- UNII: 9B2PFY5LLZ
- CompTox Dashboard (EPA): DTXSID90952589

Chemical and physical data
- Formula: C_{8}H_{20}NO
- Molar mass: 146.254 g·mol^{−1}
- 3D model (JSmol): Interactive image
- SMILES: CC[N+](CC)(CC)CCO
- InChI: InChI=1S/C11H26NO/c1-7-10(12(4,5)6)11(13,8-2)9-3/h10,13H,7-9H2,1-6H3/q+1; Key:FWWCPIVPYLRCPR-UHFFFAOYSA-N

Triethylcholine is a drug which mimics choline, and causes failure of cholinergic transmission by interfering with synthesis of acetylcholine in nerve endings.

== Effects ==
Triethylcholine produces a slowly developing neuromuscular weakness that is exacerbated by exercise, resembling the symptoms of myasthenia gravis. It also has ganglionic blocking effects, causing transient autonomic symptoms such as hypotension. Muscles stimulated at a high contraction rate are much more affected than those stimulated at a low rate. The muscle weakness typically lasts for 80 to 120 minutes; it is partially relieved by rest. High doses may result in death from respiratory failure, particularly after exercise. Triethylcholine seems to interfere with the synthesis of acetylcholine in the presynaptic nerve endings, since its effects are reversed by choline but not by acetylcholinesterase inhibitors. However the mechanism of action is not definitely known. Animal experiments revealed a relatively low acute toxicity: intravenous administration of 10–25 mg/kg triethylcholine iodide produced slight to moderate exercise intolerance, while 100 mg/kg caused death in rabbits after continuous exercise. However, there was no full paralysis even at fatal doses.

== See also ==
- Hemicholinium-3
- Tetraethylammonium
