= Adhyperforin =

Chemical compound

Clinical data
- Routes of administration: Oral
- ATC code: none

Legal status
- Legal status: In general: Over-the-counter (OTC)

Identifiers
- IUPAC name: (1R,5S,6R,7S)-4-Hydroxy-6-methyl-5-(2-methylbutanoyl)-1,3,7-tris(3-methyl-2-buten-1-yl)-6-(4-methyl-3-penten-1-yl)bicyclo[3.3.1]non-3-ene-2,9-dione
- CAS Number: 143183-63-5
- PubChem CID: 9963735
- ChemSpider: 25066875
- UNII: EC9K3C78V8
- ChEMBL: ChEMBL388948

Chemical and physical data
- Formula: C_{36}H_{54}O_{4}
- Molar mass: 550.824 g·mol^{−1}
- 3D model (JSmol): Interactive image
- SMILES: CCC(C)C(=O)C12C(=C(C(=O)C(C1=O)(CC(C2(C)CCC=C(C)C)CC=C(C)C)CC=C(C)C)CC=C(C)C)O
- InChI: InChI=1S/C36H54O4/c1-12-27(10)30(37)36-32(39)29(18-16-25(6)7)31(38)35(33(36)40,21-19-26(8)9)22-28(17-15-24(4)5)34(36,11)20-13-14-23(2)3/h14-16,19,27-28,39H,12-13,17-18,20-22H2,1-11H3/t27?,28-,34+,35+,36-/m0/s1; Key:DHPDSOCOUJHGHE-ACJQSPJVSA-N

Adhyperforin is a phytochemical found in the members of the plant genus Hypericum including St. John's Wort. It has a very similar pharmacological profile to hyperforin and acts as a TRPC6 ion channel activator, thereby inhibiting the reuptake of various neurotransmitters including serotonin, norepinephrine, dopamine, GABA, and glutamate. Adhyperforin is found in St. John's Wort in levels approximately 1/10 those of hyperforin.

== See also ==
- Hyperforin
