= Tricyanoaminopropene =

Chemical compound

Clinical data
- Trade names: Triap

Legal status
- Legal status: Investigational

Identifiers
- IUPAC name: 1,1,3-tricyano-2-amino-1-propene
- CAS Number: 868-54-2
- PubChem CID: 13356
- ChemSpider: 12787
- UNII: OC6G895YHN
- CompTox Dashboard (EPA): DTXSID80235813
- ECHA InfoCard: 100.011.616

Chemical and physical data
- Formula: C_{6}H_{4}N_{4}
- Molar mass: 132.126 g·mol^{−1}
- 3D model (JSmol): Interactive image
- SMILES: C(C#N)C(=C(C#N)C#N)N
- InChI: InChI=1S/C6H4N4/c7-2-1-6(10)5(3-8)4-9/h1,10H2; Key:BNHGNFYPZNDLAF-UHFFFAOYSA-N

Tricyanoaminopropene (TRIAP, TCAP, malononitrile dimer, 1,1,3-tricyano-2-amino-1-propene) is a nootropic drug which mimics the function of nerve growth factor and increases the growth of nerves and tissue regeneration both in isolated tissues and in vivo. It stimulates the action of the enzyme choline acetyltransferase, resulting in increased acetylcholine production. This then results in increased synthesis of RNA in many different tissues in the body. The drug causes a temporary hypothyroidism syndrome which resolves once discontinued.

Tricyanoaminopropene reduces the amnesia produced by electroconvulsive shock, and animal tests suggested nootropic activity, but no beneficial effect was found when it was tested in mentally disabled children, and administration to pregnant rats actually reduced learning ability in their young because of anti-thyroid hormone effects.

It is unknown if this drug is actually safe or effective in humans.

== See also ==
- Racetams
