= Vesamicol =

Chemical compound

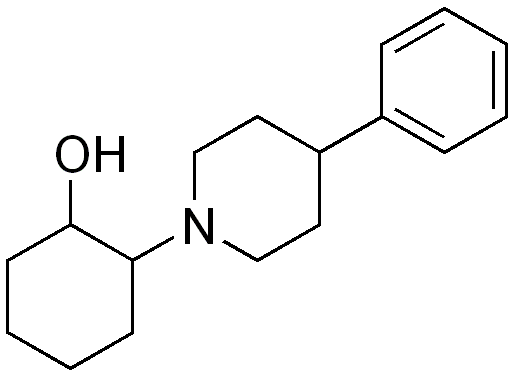

Legal status
- Legal status: Investigational

Identifiers
- IUPAC name: 2-(4-Phenyl-1-piperidyl)cyclohexan-1-ol
- CAS Number: 22232-64-0
- PubChem CID: 5662
- IUPHAR/BPS: 4759
- ChemSpider: 5460
- UNII: 3D416V0FLM
- ChEMBL: ChEMBL20730
- CompTox Dashboard (EPA): DTXSID701009898

Chemical and physical data
- Formula: C_{17}H_{25}NO
- Molar mass: 259.393 g·mol^{−1}
- 3D model (JSmol): Interactive image
- SMILES: OC1CCCCC1N2CCC(CC2)c3ccccc3

Vesamicol is an experimental drug, acting presynaptically by inhibiting acetylcholine (ACh) uptake into synaptic vesicles and reducing its release. Vesamicol may have applications for the treatment of adenocarcinoma in situ of the lung.

== Mechanism of action ==
Vesamicol can be broadly categorized as a cholinergic physiological antagonist, because it reduces the apparent activity of cholinergic neurons, but does not act at the postsynaptic ACh receptor. Vesamicol causes a non-competitive and reversible block of the intracellular transporter VAChT responsible for carrying newly synthesized ACh into secretory vesicles in the presynaptic nerve terminal. This transport process is driven by a proton gradient between cell organelles and the cytoplasm. Blocking of acetylcholine loading leads to empty vesicles fusing with neuron membranes, decreasing ACh release.
