= Chloride channel opener =

Category of drugs

Chloride channel openers refer to a specific category of drugs designed to modulate chloride channels in the human body. Chloride channels are anion-selective channels which are involved in a wide variety of physiological functions and processes such as the regulation of neuroexcitation, transepithelial salt transport, and smooth muscle contraction. Due to their distribution throughout the body, diversity, functionality, and associated pathology, chloride channels represent an ideal target for the development of channel modulating drugs such as chloride channel openers.

Chloride channel modulators include chloride channel openers, and chloride channel blockers, both of which modulate the transport of chloride ions through chloride channels. Chloride channel openers specifically work by either preventing the closure of chloride channels, or promoting their opening, thus helping to facilitate movement of chloride ions into a cell.

In general, mutations in various chloride channels throughout the human body can result in many pathologies, such as macular degeneration, myotonia, cystic fibrosis, and hyperekplexia. Chloride channel openers have been proposed to treat a variety of such pathologies, most notably including cystic fibrosis, a genetic disorder in which a defect in the cystic fibrosis transmembrane conductance regulator protein impacts chloride ion transport across epithelial cells.

Chloride channels remain a somewhat under-explored target for drug development despite their biological significance, due to various issues associated with the development of successful chloride channel drugs. As a result, the development of chloride channel modulators such as chloride channel opening drugs has been limited. The relative structural complexity of chloride channels, their varied roles in biological processes, and the problems associated with the development of drugs with high specificity emphasize the necessity for further research in this area.

== Chloride Channels ==
=== Ion Channels ===
Ion channels are pore-forming proteins which help facilitate the transport of ions across membranes, typically plasma membranes or the membranes of organelles within cells [14]. They are considered to be the second largest drug target for existing drugs, after G protein-coupled receptors. There is a wide variety of ion channels, and they are typically characterized by their gating mechanism, such as ligand-gated channels or voltage-gated channels, and the ion being transported, such as sodium (Na), potassium (K), or chloride (Cl) ions.

=== Voltage-gated ion channels ===
Several different intracellular transport channels, with varying functions, exist throughout the human body to facilitate routine upkeep and maintenance. Such transport channels, including ligand gated and voltage gated channels, regulate uptake of chemical stimulants that trigger neuronal function. Chloride (Cl-), the most abundant anion in the human body, as well as Sodium (Na+) and Potassium (K+), determine the electrochemical potential across a cell. The difference in concentration of chloride determines if a cell will depolarize or hyperpolarize the plasma membrane, resulting in a neural response. Chloride channels are a type of voltage-gated ion channel, and are responsible for regulating chloride ion transport and therefore neural excitation or inhibition.

=== Physiological significance of chloride ion channels ===
Chloride channels are present throughout the body and have important roles in many physiological processes. Some functions of chloride channels include ion homeostasis, cell volume regulation, and modulation of electrical excitability. In the central nervous system (CNS), chloride channels are responsible for both direct modulation of neuronal activity and indirect control of neuronal functions through release of gliotransmitters by astrocytes through gating of organic anions such as GABA. Chloride channels also partake in cell apoptosis caused by endoplasmic reticulum (ER) stress, in addition to their roles in modulation of membrane potential and gating anions. ER stress notably plays a role in neurological disorders such as Alzheimer's (AD).

=== Chloride ion transport ===
Chloride ions stimulate chloride channels to open, and so the active and efficient transport of chloride ions is crucial to neural function. Chloride is transported across necessary cell membranes via chloride transporting proteins. The function of these proteins is crucial for appropriate neural pathology and dysfunction of these proteins is characteristic of diseases and disorders such as epilepsy and autism.

=== Gene families of chloride channels ===
Although opinions vary among experts regarding classification of the different chloride channels, they can generally be classified into 4 families of chloride channels that have been identified, with the notable exceptions of ligand gated GABA and glycine receptors: ClC channel proteins, CFTR (cystic fibrosis transmembrane conductance regulator) channels, calcium-activated chloride channels, and voltage-dependent anion selective channels. Groups are assigned by molecular properties and variance in activation stimuli. CLC channel proteins, which are expressed on cell membranes, organelles, and vesicles, are of particular interest for the development of chloride channel openers due to their regulation of chloride ion transport and gradients for many cellular functions.

=== ClC Channel Proteins ===
ClC channel proteins, which were discovered in the 1990s, are found within the plasma and intracellular membranes of cells. Expressed as either anion channels or anion/protein exchangers, these proteins can join to form homomeric or heteromeric dimers. These proteins have both individual pathways as well as advanced pathway options when incorporated into a dimer. The specific channel and exchanger biological function roles vary based on organism type. The ClC-1 channel protein, the first identified member of this protein family, elicited extraordinary scientific interest when it was discovered to possess two gates or channels which functioned independently of one another This so-called "double-barreled" structure poses both a potential for new understanding and very complex drug design utilizing the surprising structure of the ClC-1 protein.

=== CFTR Channels ===
The cystic fibrosis transmembrane conductance regulator (CFTR) is a phosphorylation-dependent epithelial chloride channel located mostly within the apical membrane of epithelial cells to control the rate of chloride ion flow. The CFTR channels are therefore critical to determining transepithelial salt transport, fluid flow, and concentrations of ions. CFTR chloride channels have important roles in various aspects of the human body, such as in fluid and electrolyte secretion within the intestines, pancreas, and sweat glands. The structure of the CFTR consists of five domains: two nucleotide-binding domains, two membrane-spanning domains, and a single regulatory domain. Each of the domains has a different contribution to the overall function of the CFTR chloride channel. The membrane-spanning domains create the channel pore, while the phosphorylation of the regulatory domain controls the activity of the channels, and ATP hydrolysis from the nucleotide-binding domains modulates gating of the channels. When CFTR channels malfunction, the transport of chloride ions across epithelial cells is disturbed, impacting the function of various organs lined by these cells, and leading to the genetic disorder cystic fibrosis. As a result, the CFTR channels also represent a key target for the development of chloride channel agonists.

=== Calcium-activated Chloride Channels ===
The calcium-activated chloride channel family (CaCCs) are present throughout a wide range of tissues, participating in several physiological processes including epithelial secretion, sensory transduction, and smooth muscle contraction. CaCCs are activated by cytosolic calcium ions, and moderate transmembrane anion transport in response to an increase in the intracellular concentration of calcium ions. The most notable CaCC is formed by TMEM16A, which is present in several tissues of the body. TMEM16A has a variety of different functions within the various tissues it is present in, such as in chloride ion secretion with the airway epithelia, making it an important target for the development of chloride modulating drugs which treat cystic fibrosis.

=== Voltage-dependent Anion Selective Channels ===
Voltage-dependent anion selective channels (VDAC), which are also known as mitochondrial porins, are channels permeable to a variety of anions, cations, and other metabolites including ATP. At lower transmembrane potentials, VDAC channels are more selective for anions such as chloride ions, as opposed to cations, but at higher transmembrane potentials, they favor cations over anions. Therefore, these large-pore channels likely play a key role in regulating the transport of metabolites, including chloride ions, in and out of the mitochondria, and could potentially present as a target for chloride channel modulating drugs. However, other types of chloride channels would likely present a more viable option for the development of channel modulator drugs such as chloride channel agonists.

=== GABA receptors ===
GABAergic receptors, which receive GABA, the most prevalent inhibitory neurotransmitter found within the mammalian CNS, can be further divided into three subclasses: GABA-A, GABA-B, and GABA-C. Both GABA-A and GABA–C receptors are ionotropic ligand-gated chloride channels, while the GABA-B receptor is a G-protein-linked metabotropic receptor. The ionotropic GABA-A and GABA-C receptors can be activated by GABA to open and allow entry of negatively chloride ions into a cell, playing a significant role in the control of neuronal excitability. As a result, both GABA-A and GABA-C receptors, particularly GABA-A receptors, represent prominent targets for the development of chloride channel agonist drugs.

=== GABA-A receptor inhibition ===
GABA-A receptors are GABA-gated anion channels which are involved in the function of rapid inhibitory synaptic transmission through the vertebrate CNS [28]. These receptors are coupled with intrinsic chloride channels that are triggered to open through the binding of GABA, which is an inhibitory neurotransmitter. When activated, GABAergic inhibition of two types, phasic and tonic, will occur. Phasic GABA-A receptor-mediated inhibition is a result of a brief exposure of postsynaptic GABA-A receptors to high concentrations of GABA. Alternatively, tonic GABA-A receptor-mediated inhibition results from an activation of extrasynaptic receptors by low concentrations of ambient GABA. Somewhere between 75% and 90% of GABA-A inhibition in the CNS is tonic.

=== GABA-A receptor structure and disease ===
GABA-A receptors are part of the cys-loop pentameric ligand-gated ion channel family, which includes multiple neurotransmitter-gated channels. GABAA receptors are assembled from five subunits. Such subunits and splice variants can be distinguished as α1-α6, β1-β3, γ1-γ3, δ, ε, π and θ. GABA-A receptor subunit mutations are believed to be a potential cause for many neurological and CNS disorders. For example, epilepsy related sleep disturbances are believed to be partially caused by improper activation of the β3 GABA-A receptor subunit. Various other pathological mood disorders including anxiety and schizophrenia are major therapeutic targets for GABA-A. GABA-A therapeutics are a related therapy that could potentially be treated or targeted by chloride ion channel opener drugs.

=== Perception of chloride ion gated channels as drug targets ===
Chloride channels were largely overlooked as drug targets for many years with a greater emphasis placed on ligand gated channels due to the high selectivity (easy targeting) of ligands in comparison to chloride ions. Outside of the discovery of the GABA-A receptors, chloride channels have remained understudied in the world of drug therapeutics. The discovery of GABA-A receptors has allowed the scientific community to see that chloride channels could have a direct link to central nervous system (CNS) cell operation. However, the lack of a complete understanding of the precise workings of chloride channels hinders the creation of drugs which can modulate these channels with a high level of specificity.

== Channel Modulators Overview ==
=== Channel Modulators ===
Channel modulating drugs, otherwise known as ion channel modulators, belong to a category of drugs which control the operation of ion channels. Channel modulators can act as either blockers or openers of these channels, and can either directly or indirectly modulate ion channels. Ion channel modulation is of great significance in drug development, as ion channel modulators can be used to treat a wide variety of medical conditions, including diabetes and hypertension.

=== Targeting Ion Channels ===
Ion channels are significant drug targets due to their importance in a vast range of physiological processes. However, the development of ion channel modulating drugs has historically been challenging due to certain factors such target specificity, structural complexity of ion channel proteins, identification of drug binding sites, and the drug screening methods. Regarding specificity, as ion channels have a variety of different functions, a lack of selectivity can cause undesirable side effects from channel modulators.

=== Mechanism of Action ===
There are a variety of factors that contribute to the activation of chloride channels. Some of the factors contributing to CLC activation would be cellular swelling, chloride imbalance, intracellular Ca2+ signaling, membrane potential changes, and intracellular pH changes, among others.

One example of a common chloride channel activator which is used to treat both constipation caused by IBS (irritable bowel syndrome) as well as cystic fibrosis would be Lubiprostone. This drug is poorly absorbed following oral administration, until its eventual metabolization within the stomach and the small intestine (specifically the jejunum). After it is metabolized, Lubiprostone utilizes membrane stimulation to selectively stimulate CLC-2 (type 2 chloride channels) channels leading to a pathway that releases fluids, relieving symptoms. Another example would be the drug ivermectin which binds to glutamate-gated chloride channel receptors, triggering them to open and allow chloride ions to flow into a cell. Ivermectin binds in the transmembrane domain of the glutamate-gated chloride channel receptors, allowing for an open-pore conformation.

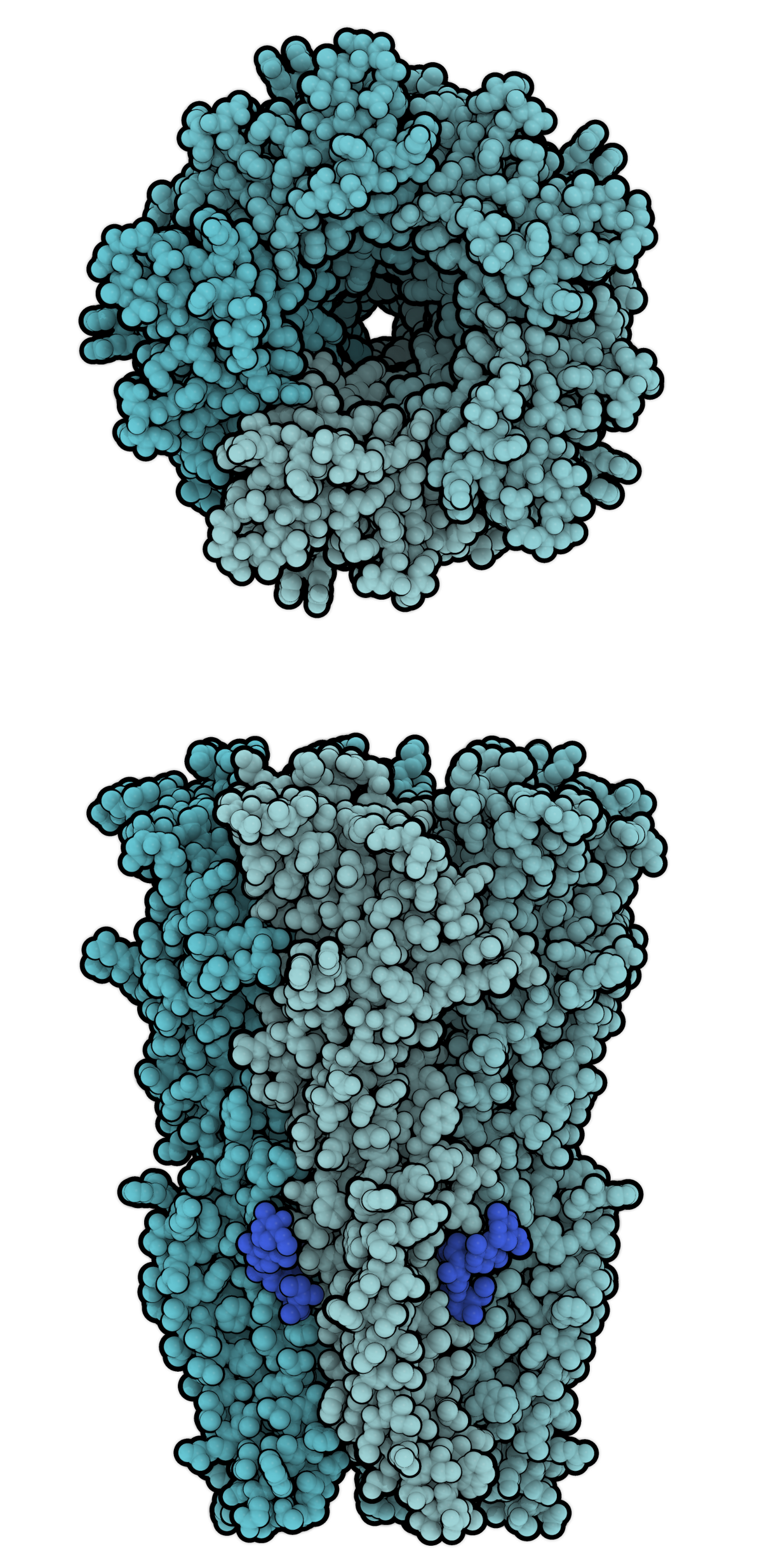
ivermectin (shown in dark blue) bound to the glutamate-gated chloride channel receptor (shown in turquoise). From PDB: 3RHW.

=== Medical Use/Treatment ===
The development of drug targets for anion gated channels such as chloride channels has lagged behind the development of cation gated channels due to technical challenges pertaining to the screening methods for chloride-channel modulators. As the technology used for the development of cation and anion gated channel targets is largely similar, many of the strategies used to do so can be applied interchangeably. The major hurdle to the development of chloride gated channel drugs is therefore the screening method. There are an abundance of known toxins that are capable of modulating cations, allowing for molecular characterization of cation gated channels. While it is widely accepted that anion channels are present in every mammalian cell, it has been more difficult to characterize them.

== Applications ==
=== Treating genetic mutations which cause Cystic Fibrosis ===
Chloride gated channel opener mutations have been a major pharmacologic target, as dysfunction of this receptor results in common muscular diseases such as hyperekplexia and even depressive disorders. One such musculoskeletal disorder that is also influenced by mutations in chloride gated channels is cystic fibrosis [5]. A mutation of the cystic fibrosis transmembrane conductance regulator (CFTR) chloride channel is the most common mutation causing cystic fibrosis and has, therefore, been a logical target for therapeutics. The specific mutation is a deletion of the amino acid residue phenylalanine at position 508 (DeltaF508). A class of natural coumarin compounds, identified by scientists, is capable of correcting the defective chloride channel gating. The compound, which is a Chinese medicinal herb, was mixed with a cAMP (cyclic adenosine monophosphate) agonist and exposed to a mutation in question. The DeltaF508-CFTR was activated by the coumarin and cAMP agonist mixture. Upon washing the coumarin from the assay, the activation of the DeltaF508-CFTR was terminated. This innovation indicates that natural lead compounds could be used as chloride channel opener drugs.

=== Treating CNS/Neurological Disorders ===
Many of the functions of the Central Nervous System (CNS) rely heavily upon the homeostasis of chloride ion levels. While chloride channels (CLC) and ion transporters are both useful in regulating this homeostasis, chloride channels provide a quicker response to changes in molecular levels, making them essential to CNS function. In particular, CLC-1 and CLC-2 channels play essential roles in the function of the CNS; their dysfunction or mutation can lead to neurological disorders. CLC-1 is present in the hippocampus, frontal neocortex, and nuclei of the brainstem and thalamus. Due to its role in physiological processes such as neuronal network maturation and excitability, manipulation of the chloride channel has been linked to diseases such as epilepsy. Multiple companies have created chloride channel targeting drugs with the intent of modulating/altering CLC-1 function, such as Acetazolamide (a drug that elevates chloride conductance, acting as a chloride channel opener) and NMD670, a CLC-1 inhibitor. CLC-2 is more commonly expressed in the CNS and thus contributes to a wide array of functions that can lead to disease states if mutated. In particular, CLC-2 mediates chloride currents and aids with blood flow and neuroprotection of the hippocampus. CLC-2 channel dimers have protopores that can be opened individually or together via a common gating process activated by hyperpolarization. Drugs such as Omeprazole and Lubistiprone seek to activate CLC-2 channels in specific areas utilizing their ability to be activated by methods such as extracellular pH shift. CLC-2 has also been linked to neurological diseases such as epilepsy.

=== Treating Epilepsy ===
As one of the most common neurological disorders, epilepsy is an advantageous target for treatment. It is believed that epilepsy is associated with extremely high levels of calcium, up to 2-5 times the normal physiological levels of calcium. Propositions have been made to utilize the relationship between extracellular and intracellular ions to regulate high and persistently high levels of calcium when applicable. Though this approach could, in theory, be a solution, the lack of success in studies targeting calcium channels for this expressed purpose have been mostly abandoned [27]. Thus, the likelihood of further investment in chloride ion channel openers as opposed to calcium ion channel openers is low without significant scientific discovery or innovation.

== Future Perspectives ==
Future research on chloride channel opener drugs will likely involve the complete translation of chloride channel opener research from concept to incorporation into human medicine. While chloride channel openers, and modulators in general, are gaining traction as a promising treatment target for diseases such as cystic fibrosis, there are very few treatments that have progressed past animal models. Indeed, Lubistiprone (trade name: Amitiza) is one of the only commercially available uses of chloride channel openers in humans.

One of the major issues preventing the development of not only chloride channel openers, but any channel modulators specifically targeting chloride channels would be the relatively poor understanding of certain aspects of chloride channels themselves. Although a vast range of information is available regarding chloride channel function and physiological roles, there are gaps in the present literature, such as the molecular identification of volume-sensitive chloride channels. The relatively intricate and complex structures of chloride channel proteins and the somewhat limited knowledge of certain types of chloride channels creates obstacles for the development of chloride channel modulators. Most notably, this lack of understanding results in difficulties in developing chloride channel modulators with a high level of specificity. Further research regarding the functioning and properties of chloride channels would be necessary in order to overcome this barrier to the development of drugs targeting them.

Regarding the future direction of chloride channel opener drug development, research will likely proceed to the exploration of applications outside of the realm of cystic fibrosis. It has been observed that mutations in chloride channel proteins can result in a multitude of diseases and disorders beyond cystic fibrosis due to their importance in several biological processes. For example, mutated chloride channels can cause osteoporosis, kidney stones, muscle disorder myotonia, and more. Due to the diverse set of conditions that are linked to chloride channel proteins, there is great potential for future research into chloride channel openers for conditions outside of cystic fibrosis such as epilepsy and other neurological diseases affected by CLCs.

== See also ==
- Chloride channel blocker
