= Receptor modulator =

Substance that binds to and regulates the activity of chemical receptors

A receptor modulator, or receptor ligand, is a general term for a substance, endogenous or exogenous, that binds to and regulates the activity of chemical receptors. They are ligands that can act on different parts of receptors and regulate activity in a positive, negative, or neutral direction with varying degrees of efficacy. Categories of these modulators include receptor agonists and receptor antagonists, as well as receptor partial agonists, inverse agonists, orthosteric modulators, and allosteric modulators, Examples of receptor modulators in modern medicine include CFTR modulators, selective androgen receptor modulators (SARMs), and muscarinic ACh receptor modulators.

== Categorization and function ==
Currently, receptor modulators are categorized in the Agonist, Partial Agonist, Selective Tissue Modulators, Antagonist, and Inverse Agonist categories in terms of the effect they cause. They are further divided into Orthosteric or Allosteric Modulators according to how they effect said result. Typically, a chemical acts in an agonist fashion whenever it instigates or else facilitates a particular reaction by binding to a particular receptor. In contract, a chemical acts as an antagonist whenever binding to a particular receptor blocks or inhibits a particular response. Between these endpoints exists a gradient defined by a number of variables. One example is Selective Tissue Modulators, which mean a given ligand can behave differently according to the tissue type it is in. As for orthosteric and allosteric modulation, this describes the manner in which the ligand binds to the receptor in question: if it binds directly to the prescribed binding site of a receptor, the ligand is orthosteric in this instance; if the ligand alters the receptor by interacting with it at any place other than a binding site, allosteric interaction occurred. Note that a drug's categorization does not dictate how another drug of the same family could be categorized or whether the same drug may also function in another category. An example is found in medications used to treat opioid addiction, with methadone, buprenorphine, naloxone, and naltrexone all in separate categories or in more than one simultaneously. In addition, depending on the cell type, the specific effect, whether agonist, antagonist, inverse agonist, etc., could have a unique specific effect. An example is seen in insulin, under "Receptor Agonists," as it interacts with multiple different cell types as an agonist, but incites multiple and different responses in both.

== Agonists ==
=== Receptor agonists ===
A receptor agonist is a chemical that binds to a receptor with the end result of directly inducing a conformational change in the bound receptor and activating a downstream effect. Some common examples are opium derivates, such as heroin and Toll-like receptor agonists. Heroin functions in this manner, along with other opioids, when bound to μ-opioid receptors. Opioids' manner of action are both concentration- and receptor-dependent, which provides a key difference between agonists and partial agonists. Another example is insulin, which activates cell receptors to instigate blood glucose uptake.

=== Partial agonists ===
Partial agonists are any chemical that can bind to a receptor without eliciting the maximum downstream response as compared to the response from a full agonist. A given partial agonist's affinity for a given receptor is also irrelevant to the consequent effect. An example is buprenorphine, a partial opioid receptor agonist used to treat opioid addictions by directly substituting for them without the same strength of effect.

== Receptor antagonists ==
A receptor antagonist is any given ligand that binds to a receptor in some way without causing any immediate or downstream response, essentially neutralizing the receptor until something with a stronger affinity removes the antagonist or the antagonist itself unbinds. Generally, antagonists can act one of two ways: 1) they can either block the receptors directly, preventing the usual ligand from binding, such as in the case of atropine when it blocks specific acetylcholine receptors to provide important medical benefits. This is competitive antagonism, as they are competing for the same binding sites on the receptor. The other is by binding to a receptor in a site other than the designated receptor site, inducing a conformational change to prevent the usual ligand(s) from binding and activating a downstream cascade. A commonly-seen and used receptor antagonist is naloxone, another opioid competitive antagonist typically used to treat opioid overdoses by blocking receptors outright. Further elaboration can be found in "Orthosteric v. Allosteric Modulators."

== Inverse agonists ==
Inverse agonists differ from regular agonists in that they effect receptors to which a regular agonist binds such that the bound receptors demonstrate reduced activity compared to when they are normally inactive. In other words, inverse antagonists limit the efficacy of the bound receptor in some way. This is noted to be beneficial in instances wherein expression of receptors or up-regulated receptor sensitivity could be detrimental, thus making suppression of response the best recourse. A handful of examples of inverse agonist use in therapy include β-blockers, antihistamines, ACP-103 to treat Parkinson's disease, hemopressin, drugs to treat obesity, and more besides.

== See also ==
- Channel modulator
- Transporter modulator
