= Chloride channel blocker =

Type of drug

A chloride channel blocker is a type of drug which inhibits the transmission of ions (Cl^{−}) through chloride channels.

Niflumic acid is a chloride channel blocker that has been used in experimental scientific research. Another example is anthracene-9-carboxylic acid, a potent blocker of the CLCN1-type chloride channel found in skeletal muscle, which is used to study animal models of myotonia congenita.

Some antagonists of glycine receptors and GABAA receptors also act as chloride channel blockers.

== See also ==
- Chloride channel opener
