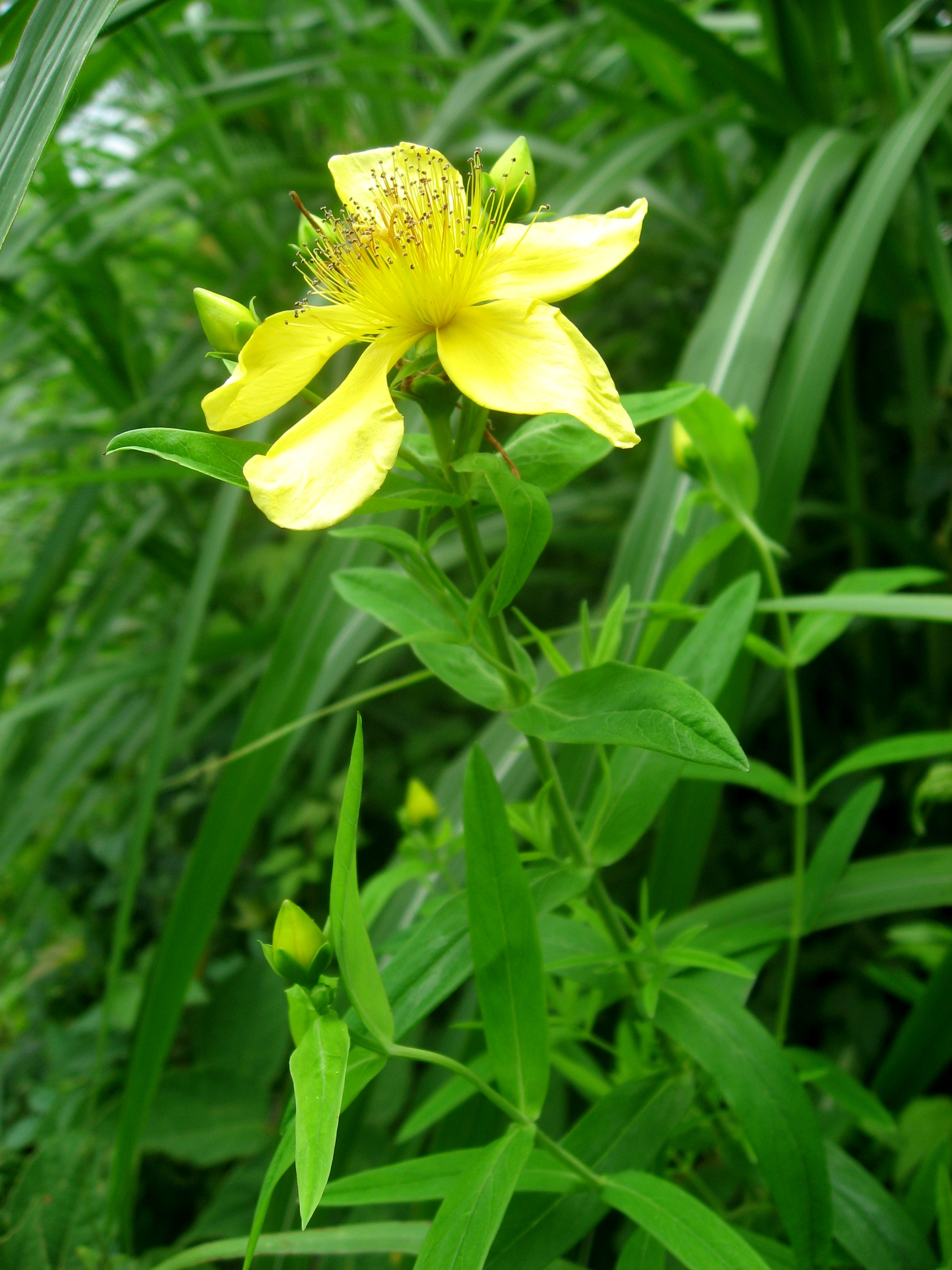

Scientific classification
- Kingdom: Plantae
- Clade: Tracheophytes
- Clade: Angiosperms
- Clade: Eudicots
- Clade: Rosids
- Order: Malpighiales
- Family: Hypericaceae
- Genus: Hypericum
- Section: Hypericum sect. Roscyna
- Species: H. ascyron

Binomial name
- Hypericum ascyron L.

= Hypericum ascyron =

Species of flowering plant in the St John's wort family

Hypericum ascyron, the great St. Johnswort or giant St. John's wort is a flowering plant in the family Hypericaceae.

== Description ==
This large species of Hypericum grows to be 3–5 feet (0.9–1.5 m) tall. It is perennial and its leaves are a deep green, elliptic, and grow up to 5 inches (13 cm) long. Its flowers have five petals and it can have thirteen or more stamens.

== Taxonomy ==
Accepted infraspecifics include:

- Hypericum ascyron subsp. ascyron
- Hypericum ascyron subsp. gebleri
- Hypericum ascyron subsp. pyramidatum

== Distribution ==
It is found Asia and North America, in the latter primarily in the American Midwest, as well as parts of New England and Quebec. It occurs in Russia, Mongolia, Korea, Taiwan, China, Vietnam, Canada, and the United States.
