= Antiporter =

Class of transmembrane transporter protein

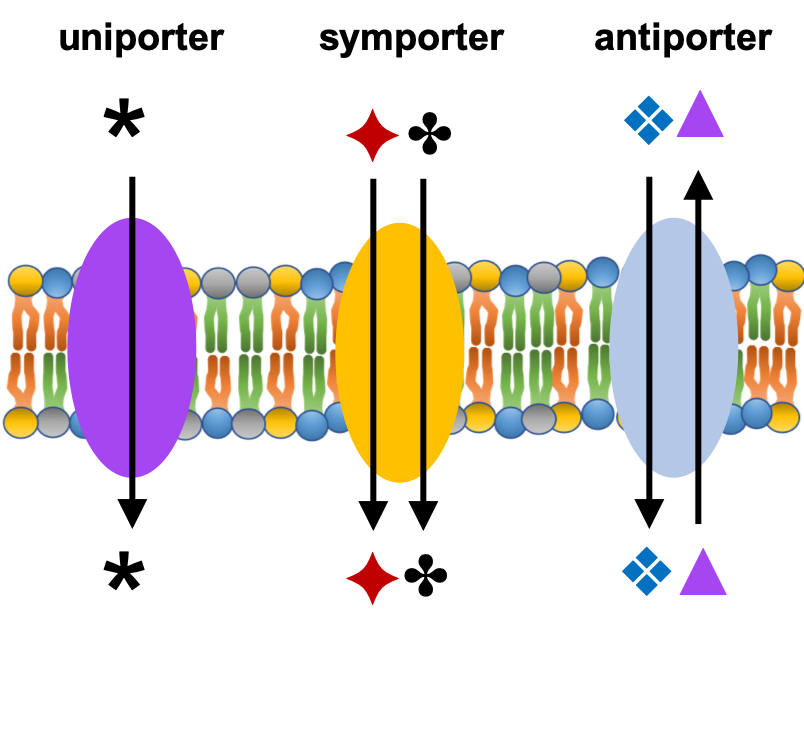
A comparison of transport proteins

An antiporter (also called exchanger or counter-transporter) is an integral membrane protein that uses secondary active transport to move two or more molecules in opposite directions across a phospholipid membrane. It is a type of cotransporter, which means that uses the energetically favorable movement of one molecule down its electrochemical gradient to power the energetically unfavorable movement of another molecule up its electrochemical gradient. This is in contrast to symporters, which are another type of cotransporter that moves two or more ions in the same direction, and primary active transport, which is directly powered by ATP.

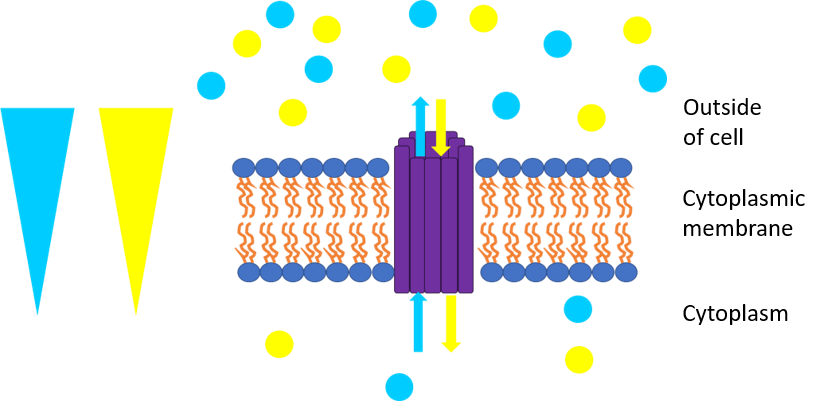
Illustration of an antiporter and the concentration gradients of its transport substances

Transport may involve one or more of each type of solute. For example, the Na^{+}/Ca^{2+} exchanger, found in the plasma membrane of many cells, moves three sodium ions in one direction, and one calcium ion in the other. As with sodium in this example, antiporters rely on an established gradient that makes entry of one ion energetically favorable to force the unfavorable movement of a second molecule in the opposite direction. Through their diverse functions, antiporters are involved in various important physiological processes, such as regulation of the strength of cardiac muscle contraction, transport of carbon dioxide by erythrocytes, regulation of cytosolic pH, and accumulation of sucrose in plant vacuoles.

== Background ==
Cotransporters are found in all organisms and fall under the broader category of transport proteins, a diverse group of transmembrane proteins that includes uniporters, symporters, and antiporters. Each of them are responsible for providing a means of movement for water-soluble molecules that otherwise would not be able to pass through lipid-based plasma membrane. The simplest of these are the uniporters, which facilitate the movement of one type of molecule in the direction that follows its concentration gradient. In mammals, they are most commonly responsible for bringing glucose and amino acids into cells.

Symporters and antiporters are more complex because they move more than one ion and the movement of one of those ions is in an energetically unfavorable direction. As multiple molecules are involved, multiple binding processes must occur as the transporter undergoes a cycle of conformational changes to move them from one side of the membrane to the other. The mechanism used by these transporters limits their functioning to moving only a few molecules at a time. As a result, symporters and antiporters are characterized by a slower transport speed, moving between 10^{2} and 10^{4} molecules per second. Compare this to ion channels that provide a means for facilitated diffusion to occur and allow between 10^{7} and 10^{8} ions pass through the plasma membrane per second.

Though ATP-powered pumps also move molecules in an energetically unfavorable direction and undergo conformational changes to do so, they fall under a different category of membrane proteins because they couple the energy derived from ATP hydrolysis to transport their respective ions. These ion pumps are very selective, consisting of a double gating system where at least one of the gates is always shut. The ion is allowed to enter from one side of the membrane while one of the gates is open, after which it will shut. Only then will the second gate open to allow the ion to leave on the membrane's opposite side. The time between the alternating gate opening is referred to as the occluded state, where the ions are bound and both gates are shut. These gating reactions limit the speed of these pumps, causing them to function even slower than transport proteins, moving between 10^{0} and 10^{3} ions per second.

== Structure and function ==
To function in active transport, a membrane protein must meet certain requirements. The first of these is that the interior of the protein must contain a cavity that is able to contain its corresponding molecule or ion. Next, the protein must be able to assume at least two different conformations, one with its cavity open to the extracellular space and the other with its cavity open to the cytosol. This is crucial for the movement of molecules from one side of the membrane to the other. Finally, the cavity of the protein must contain binding sites for its ligands, and these binding sites must have a different affinity for the ligand in each of the protein's conformations. Without this, the ligand will not be able to bind to the transporter on one side of the plasma membrane and be released from it on the other side. As transporters, antiporters have all of these features.

Because antiporters are highly diverse, their structure can vary widely depending upon the type of molecules being transported and their location in the cell. However, there are some common features that all antiporters share. One of these is multiple transmembrane regions that span the lipid bilayer of the plasma membrane and form a channel through which hydrophilic molecules can pass. These transmembrane regions are typically structured from alpha helices and are connected by loops in both the extracellular space and cytosol. These loops are what contain the binding sites for the molecules associated with the antiporter.

These features of antiporters allow them to carry out their function in maintaining cellular homeostasis. They provide a space where a hydrophilic molecule can pass through the hydrophobic lipid bilayer, allowing them to bypass the hydrophobic interactions of the plasma membrane. This enables the efficient movement of molecules needed for the environment of the cell, such as in the acidification of organelles. The varying affinity of the antiporter for each ion or molecule on either side of the plasma membrane allows it to bind to and release its ligands on the appropriate side of the membrane according to the electrochemical gradient of the ion being harnessed for its energetically favorable concentration.

== Mechanism ==
A simplified illustration of the mechanism of an antiporter

The mechanism of antiporter transport involves several key steps and a series of conformational changes that are dictated by the structural element described above:

1. The substrate binds to its specific binding site on the extracellular side of the plasma membrane, forming a temporary substrate-bound open form of the antiporter.
2. This becomes an occluded, substrate-bound state that is still facing the extracellular space.
3. The antiporter undergoes a conformational change to become an occluded, substrate-bound protein that is now facing the cytosol. As it does so, it passes through a temporary fully-occluded intermediate stage.
4. The substrate is released from the antiporter as it takes on an open, inward-facing conformation.
5. The antiporter can now bind to its second substrate and transport it in the opposite direction by taking on its transient substrate-bound open state.
6. This is followed by an occluded, substrate-bound state that is still facing the cytosol, a conformation change with a temporary fully-occluded intermediate stage, and a return to the antiporter's open, outward-facing conformation.
7. The second substrate is released and the antiporter can return to its original conformation state, where it is ready to bind to new molecules or ions and repeat its transport process.

== History ==
Antiporters were discovered as scientists were exploring ion transport mechanisms across biological membranes. The early studies took place in the mid-20th century and were focused on the mechanisms that transported ions such as sodium, potassium, and calcium across the plasma membrane. Researchers made the observation that these ions were moved in opposite directions and hypothesized the existence of membrane proteins that could facilitate this type of transport.

In the 1960's, biochemist Efraim Racker made a breakthrough in the discovery of antiporters. Through purification from bovine heart mitochondria, Racker and his colleagues found a mitochondrial protein that could exchange inorganic phosphate for hydroxide ions. The protein is located in the inner mitochondrial membrane and transports phosphate ions for use in oxidative phosphorylation. It became known as the phosphate-hydroxide antiporter, or mitochondrial phosphate carrier protein, and was the first example of an antiporter identified in living cells.

As time went on, researchers discovered other antiporters in different membranes and in various organisms. This includes the sodium-calcium exchanger (NCX), another crucial antiporter that regulates intracellular calcium levels through the exchange of sodium ions for calcium ions across the plasma membrane. It was discovered in the 1970s and is now a well-characterized antiporter known to be found in many different types of cells.

Advances in the fields of biochemistry and molecular biology have enabled the identification and characterization of a wide range of antiporters. Understanding the transport processes of various molecules and ions has provided insight into cellular transport mechanisms, as well as the role of antiporters in various physiological functions and in the maintenance of homeostasis

== Role in homeostasis ==
=== Sodium-calcium exchanger ===
The sodium-calcium exchanger, also known as the Na^{+}/Ca^{2+} exchanger or NCX, is an antiporter responsible for removing calcium from cells. This title encompasses a class of ion transporters that are commonly found in the heart, kidney, and brain. They use the energy stored in the electrochemical gradient of sodium to exchange the flow of three sodium ions into the cell for the export of one calcium ion. Though this exchanger is most common in the membranes of the mitochondria and the endoplasmic reticulum of excitable cells, it can be found in many different cell types in various species.

Although the sodium-calcium exchanger has a low affinity for calcium ions, it can transport a high amount of the ion in a short period of time. Because of these properties, it is useful in situations where there is an urgent need to export high amounts of calcium, such as after an action potential has occurred. Its characteristics also enable NCX to work with other proteins that have a greater affinity for calcium ions without interfering with their functions. NCX works with these proteins to carry out functions such as cardiac muscle relaxation, excitation-contraction coupling, and photoreceptor activity. They also maintain the concentration of calcium ions in the sarcoplasmic reticulum of cardiac cells, endoplasmic reticulum of excitable and nonexcitable cells, and the mitochondria.

Another key characteristic of this antiporter is its reversibility. This means that if the cell is depolarized enough, the extracellular sodium level is low enough, or the intracellular level of sodium is high enough, NCX will operate in the reverse direction and begin bringing calcium into the cell. For example, when NCX functions during excitotoxicity, this characteristic allows it to have a protective effect because the accompanying increase in intracellular calcium levels enables the exchanger to work in its normal direction regardless of the sodium concentration. Another example is the depolarization of cardiac muscle cells, which is accompanied by a large increase in the intracellular sodium concentration that causes NCX to work in reverse. Because the concentration of calcium is carefully regulated during the cardiac action potential, this is only a temporary effect as calcium is pumped out of the cell.

The sodium-calcium exchanger's role in maintaining calcium homeostasis in cardiac muscle cells allows it to help relax the heart muscle as it exports calcium during diastole. Therefore, its dysfunction can result in abnormal calcium movement and the development of various cardiac diseases. Abnormally high intracellular calcium levels can hinder diastole and cause abnormal systole and arrhythmias. Arrhythmias can occur when calcium is not properly exported by NCX, causing delayed afterdepolarizations and triggering abnormal activity that can possibly lead to atrial fibrillation and ventricular tachycardia.

If the heart experiences ischemia, the inadequate oxygen supply can disrupt ion homeostasis. When the body tries to stabilize this by returning blood to the area, ischemia-reperfusion injury, a type of oxidative stress, occurs. If NCX is dysfunctional, it can exacerbate the increase of calcium that accompanies reperfusion, causing cell death and tissue damage. Similarly, NCX dysfunction has found to be involved in ischemic strokes. Its activity is upregulated, causing an increased cytosolic calcium level, which can lead to neuronal cell death.

The Na^{+}/Ca^{2+} exchanger has also been implicated in neurological disorders such as Alzheimer's disease and Parkinson's disease. Its dysfunction can result in oxidative stress and neuronal cell death, contributing to the cognitive decline that characterizes Alzheimer's disease. The dysregulation of calcium homeostasis has been found to be a key part of neuron death and Alzheimer's pathogenesis. For example, neurons that have neurofibrillary tangles contain high levels of calcium and show hyperactivation of calcium-dependent proteins. The abnormal calcium handling of atypical NCX function can also cause the mitochondrial dysfunction, oxidative stress, and neuronal cell death that characterize Parkinson's. In this case, if dopaminergic neurons of the substantia nigra are affected, it can contribute to the onset and development of Parkinson's disease. Although the mechanism is not entirely understood, disease models have shown a link between NCX and Parkinson's and that NCX inhibitors can prevent death of dopaminergic neurons.

=== Sodium-hydrogen antiporter ===
The sodium–hydrogen antiporter, also known as the sodium-proton exchanger, Na+/H+ exchanger, or NHE, is an antiporter responsible for transporting sodium into the cell and hydrogen out of the cell. As such, it is important in the regulation of cellular pH and sodium levels. There are differences among the types of NHE antiporter families present in eukaryotes and prokaryotes. The 9 isoforms of this transporter that are found in the human genome fall under several families, including the cation-proton antiporters (CPA 1, CPA 2, and CPA 3) and sodium-transporting carboxylic acid decarboxylase (NaT-DC). Prokaryotic organisms contain the Na+/H+ antiporter families NhaA, NhaB, NhaC, NhaD, and NhaE.

Because enzymes can only function at certain pH ranges, it is critical for cells to tightly regulate cytosolic pH. When a cell's pH is outside of the optimal range, the sodium-hydrogen antiporter detects this and is activated to transport ions as a homeostatic mechanism to restore pH balance. Since ion flux can be reversed in mammalian cells, NHE can also be used to transport sodium out of the cell to prevent excess sodium from accumulating and causing toxicity.

As suggested by its functions, this antiporter is located in the kidney for sodium reabsorption regulation and in the heart for intracellular pH and contractility regulation. NHE plays an important role in the nephron of the kidney, especially in the cells of the proximal convoluted tubule and collecting duct. The sodium-hydrogen antiporter's function is upregulated by Angiotensin II in the proximal convoluted tubule when the body needs to reabsorb sodium and excrete hydrogen.

Plants are sensitive to high amounts of salt, which can halt certain necessary functions of the eukaryotic organism, including photosynthesis. For the organisms to maintain homeostasis and carry out crucial functions, Na+/H+ antiporters are used to rid the cytoplasm of excess sodium by pumping Na+ out of the cell. These antiporters can also close their channel to stop sodium from entering the cell, along with allowing excess sodium within the cell to enter into a vacuole.

Dysregulation of the sodium-hydrogen antiporter's activity has been linked to cardiovascular diseases, renal disorders, and neurological conditions NHE inhibitors are being developed to treat these issues. One of the isoforms of the antiporter, NHE1, is essential to the function of the mammalian myocardium. NHE is involved in the case of hypertrophy and when damage to the heart muscle occurs, such as during ischemia and reperfusion. Studies have shown that NHE1 is more active in animal models experiencing myocardial infarction and left ventricular hypertrophy. During these cardiac events, the function of the sodium-hydrogen antiporter causes an increase in the sodium levels of cardiac muscle cells. In turn, the work of the sodium-calcium antiporter leads to more calcium being brought into the cell, which is what results in damage to the myocardium.

Five isoforms of NHE are found in kidney's epithelial cells. The best studied one is NHE3, which is mainly located in the proximal tubules of the kidney and plays a key role in acid-base homeostasis. Issues with NHE3 disrupt the reabsorption of sodium and secretion of hydrogen. The main conditions that NHE3 dysregulation can cause are hypertension and renal tubular acidosis (RTA). Hypertension can occur when more sodium is reabsorbed in the kidneys because water will follow the sodium ions and create an elevated blood volume. This, in turn, leads to elevated blood pressure. RTA is characterized by the inability of the kidneys to acidify the urine due to underactive NHE3 and reduced secretion of hydrogen ions, resulting in metabolic acidosis. On the other hand, overactive NHE3 can lead to excess secretion of hydrogen ions and metabolic alkalosis, where the blood is too alkaline.

NHE can also be linked to neurodegeneration. The dysregulation or loss of the isoform NHE6 can lead to pathological changes in the tau proteins of human neurons, which can have huge consequences. For example, Christianson Syndrome (CS) is an X-linked disorder caused by a loss-of-function mutation in NHE6, which leads to the over acidification of endosomes. In studies done on postmortem brains of individuals with CS, lower NHE6 function was linked to higher levels of tau deposition. The level of tau phosphorylation was also found to be elevated, which leads to the formation of insoluble tangles that can cause neuronal damage and death. Tau proteins are also implicated in other neurodegenerative diseases, such as Alzheimer's and Parkinson's diseases.

=== Chloride-bicarbonate antiporter ===
The chloride-bicarbonate antiporter is crucial to maintaining pH and fluid balance through its function of exchanging bicarbonate and chloride ions through cell membranes. This exchange occurs in many different types of body cells. In the cardiac Purkinje fibers and smooth muscle cells of the ureters, this antiporter is the main mechanism of chloride transport into the cells. Epithelial cells such as those of the kidney use chloride-bicarbonate exchange to regulate their volume, intracellular pH, and extracellular pH. Gastric parietal cells, osteoclasts, and other acid-secreting cells have chloride-bicarbonate antiporters that function in the basolateral membrane to dispose of excess bicarbonate left behind by the function of carbonic anhydrase and apical proton pumps. However, base-secreting cells exhibit apical chloride-bicarbonate exchange and basolateral proton pumps.

An example of a chloride-bicarbonate antiporter is the chloride anion exchanger, also known as down-regulated in adenoma (protein DRA). It is found in the intestinal mucosa, especially in the columnar epithelium and goblet cells of the apical surface of the membrane, where it carries out the function of chloride and bicarbonate exchange. Protein DRA's reuptake of chloride is critical to creating an osmotic gradient that allows the intestine to reabsorb water.

Another well-studied chloride-bicarbonate antiporter is anion exchanger 1 (AE1), which is also known as band 3 anion transport protein or solute carrier family 4 member 1 (SLC4A1). This exchanger is found in red blood cells, where it helps transport bicarbonate and carbon dioxide between the lungs and tissues to maintain acid-base homeostasis. AE1 also expressed in the basolateral side of cells of the renal tubules. It is crucial in the collecting duct of the nephron, which is where its acid-secreting α-intercalated cells are located. These cells use carbon dioxide and water to generate hydrogen and bicarbonate ions, which is catalyzed by carbonic anhydrase. The hydrogen is exchanged across the membrane into the lumen of the collecting duct, and thus acid is excreted into the urine.

Because of its importance to the reabsorption of water in the intestine, mutations in protein DRA cause a condition called congenital chloride diarrhea (CCD). This disorder is caused by an autosomal recessive mutation in the DRA gene on chromosome 7. CCD symptoms in newborns are chronic diarrhea with failure to thrive, and the disorder is characterized by diarrhea that causes metabolic alkalosis.

Mutations of kidney AE1 can lead to distal renal tubular acidosis, a disorder characterized by the inability to secrete acid into the urine. This causes metabolic acidosis, where the blood is too acidic. A chronic state of metabolic acidosis can the health of the bones, kidneys, muscles, and cardiovascular system. Mutations in erythrocyte AE1 cause alterations of its function, leading to changes in red blood cell morphology and function. This can have serious consequences because the shape of red blood cells is closely tied to their function of gas exchange in the lungs and tissues. One such condition is hereditary spherocytosis, a genetic disorder characterized by spherical red blood cells. Another is Southeast Asian ovalocytosis, where a deletion in the AE1 gene generates oval-shaped erythrocytes. Finally, overhydrated hereditary stomatocytosis is a rare genetic disorder where red blood cells have an abnormally high volume, leading to changes in hydration status.

The proper function of AE2, an isoform of AE1, is important in gastric secretion, osteoclast differentiation and function, and the synthesis of enamel. The hydrochloric acid secretion at the apical surface of both gastric parietal cells and osteoclasts relies on chloride-bicarbonate exchange in the basolateral surface. Studies found that mice with nonfunctional AE2 did not secrete hydrochloric acid, and it was concluded that the exchanger is necessary for hydrochloric acid loading in parietal cells. When AE2 expression was suppressed in an animal model, cell lines were unable to differentiate into osteoclasts and perform their functions. Additionally, cells that had osteoclast markers but were deficient in AE2 were abnormal compared to the wild-type cells and were unable to resorb mineralized tissue. This demonstrates the importance of AE2 in osteoclast function. Finally, as the hydroxyapatite crystals of enamel are being formed, a lot of hydrogen is produced, which must be neutralized so that mineralization can proceed. Mice with inactivated AE2 were toothless and suffered from incomplete enamel maturation.

=== Chloride-hydrogen antiporter ===
The chloride-hydrogen antiporter facilitates the exchange of chloride ions for hydrogen ions across plasma membranes, thus playing a critical role in maintaining acid-base balance and chloride homeostasis. It is found in various tissues, including the gastrointestinal tract, kidneys, and pancreas. The well-known chloride-hydrogen antiporters belong in the CLC family, which have isoforms from CLC-1 to CLC-7, each with a distinct tissue distribution. Their structure involves two CLC proteins coming together to form a homodimer or a heterodimer where both monomers contain an ion translocation pathway. CLC proteins can either be ion channels or anion-proton exchangers, so CLC-1 and CLC-2 are membrane chloride channels, while CLC-3 through CLC-7 are chloride-hydrogen exchangers.

CLC-4 is a member of the CLC family that is prominent in the brain, but is also located in the liver, kidneys, heart, skeletal muscle, and intestine. It likely resides in endosomes and participates in their acidification, but can also be expressed in the endoplasmic reticulum and plasma membrane. Its roles are not entirely clear, but CLC-4 has been found to possibly participate in endosomal acidification, transferrin trafficking, renal endocytosis, and the hepatic secretory pathway.

CLC-5 is one of the best-studied members of this protein family. It shares 80% of its amino acid sequence with CLC-3 and CLC-4, but it is mainly found in the kidney, especially in the proximal tubule, collecting duct, and ascending limb of the loop of Henle. It functions to transport substances through the endosomal membrane, so it is crucial for pinocytosis, receptor-mediated endocytosis, and endocytosis of plasma membrane proteins from the apical surface.

CLC-7 is another example of a CLC family protein. It is ubiquitously expressed as the chloride-hydrogen antiporter in lysosomes and in the ruffled border of osteoclasts. CLC-7 may be important for regulating to concentration of chloride in lysosomes. It is associated with a protein called Ostm1, forming a complex that allows CLC-7 to carry out its functions. For example, these proteins are crucial to the process of acidifying the resorption lacuna, which enables bone remodeling to occur.

CLC-4 has been connected with intellectual disability involving seizure disorders, facial abnormalities, and behavior disorders. Studies found frameshift and missense mutations in patients exhibiting these symptoms. Because these symptoms were mostly exhibited in males, with less severe pathology in females, it is likely X-linked. Studies done on animal models have also shown the possibility of a connection between nonfunctional CLC-4 and impaired neural branching of hippocampus neurons.

Defects in the CLC-5 gene were shown to be the cause of 60% of cases of Dent's disease, which is characterized by tubular proteinuria, formation of kidney stones, excess calcium in the urine, nephrocalcinosis, and chronic kidney failure. This is caused by abnormalities that occur in the endocytosis process when CLC-5 is mutated. Dent's disease itself is one of the causes of Fanconi syndrome, which occurs when the proximal convoluted tubules of the kidney do not perform an adequate level of reabsorption. It causes molecules produced by metabolic pathways, such as amino acids, glucose, and uric acid to be excreted in the urine instead of being reabsorbed. The result is polyuria, dehydration, rickets in children, osteomalacia in adults, acidosis, and hypokalemia.

CLC-7's role in osteoclast function was revealed by studies on knockout mice that developed severe osteopetrosis. These mice were smaller, had shortened long bones, disorganized trabecular structure, a missing medullary cavity, and their teeth did not erupt. This was found to be caused by deletion mutations, missense mutations, and gain-of-function mutations that sped up the gating of CLC-7. CLC-7 is expressed in almost every neuronal cell type, and its loss led to widespread neurodegeneration in mice, especially in the hippocampus. In longer-lived models, the cortex and hippocampus had almost entirely disappeared after 1.5 years. Finally, because of its importance in lysosomes, altered expression of CLC-7 can lead to lysosomal storage disorders. Mice with a mutation introduced to the CLC-7 gene developed lysosomal storage disease and retinal degeneration.

=== Reduced folate carrier protein ===
The reduced folate carrier protein (RFC) is a transmembrane protein responsible for the transport of folate, or vitamin B9, into cells. It uses the large gradient of organic phosphate to move folate into the cell against its concentration gradient. The RFC protein can transport folates, reduced folates, the derivatives of reduced folate, and the drug methotrexate. The transporter is encoded by the SLC19A1 gene and is ubiquitously expressed in human cells. Its peak activity occurs at pH 7.4, with no activity occurring below pH 6.4. The RFC protein is critical because folates take the form of hydrophilic anions at physiological pH, so they do not diffuse naturally across biological membranes. Folate is essential for processes such as DNA synthesis, repair, and methylation, and without entry into cells, these could not occur.

Because folates are essential for various life-sustaining processes, a deficiency in this molecule can lead to fetal abnormalities, neurological disorders, cardiovascular disease, and cancer. Folates cannot be synthesized in the body, so it must be taken in through diet and moved into cells. Without the RFC protein facilitating this movement, processes such as embryological development and DNA repair cannot occur.

Adequate folate levels are required for the development of the neural tube in the fetus. Folate deficiency during pregnancy increases the risk of defects such as spina bifida and anencephaly. In mouse models, inactivating both alleles of the FRC protein gene causes death of the embryo. Even if folate is supplemented during gestation, the mice died within two weeks of birth from the failure of hematopoietic tissues.

Altered function of the RFC protein can increase folate deficiency, enhancing cardiovascular disease, neurodegenerative diseases, and cancer. In terms of cardiovascular issues, folate contributes to homocysteine metabolism. Low folate levels result in elevated homocysteine levels, which is a risk factor for cardiovascular diseases. In terms of cancer, folate deficiency is related to an increased risk, especially that of colorectal cancers. In mouse models with altered RFC protein expression showed increased transcripts of genes related to colon cancer and increased proliferation of colonocytes. The cancer risk is likely related to the FRC protein's role in DNA synthesis because inadequate levels of folate can lead to DNA damage and aberrant DNA methylation.

=== Vesicle neurotransmitter antiporters ===
Vesicle neurotransmitter antiporters are responsible for packaging neurotransmitters into vesicles in neurons. They utilize the electrochemical gradient of hydrogen protons across the membranes of synaptic vesicles to move neurotransmitters into them. This is essential for the process of synaptic transmission, which requires neurotransmitters to be released into the synapse to bind to receptors on the next neuron.

One of the best characterized of these antiporters is the vesicular monoamine transporter (VMAT). It is responsible for the storage, sorting, and release of neurotransmitters, as well as for protecting them from autoxidation. VMAT's transport functions are dependent on the electrochemical gradient created by a vesicular hydrogen proton-ATPase. VMAT1 and VMAT2 are two isoforms that can transport monoamines such as serotonin, norepinephrine, and dopamine in a proton-dependent fashion. VMAT1 can be found in neuroendocrine cells, while VMAT2 can be found in the neurons of the central and peripheral nervous systems, as well as in adrenal chromaffin cells.

Another important vesicle neurotransmitter antiporter is the vesicular glutamate transporter (VGLUT). This family of proteins includes three isoforms, VGLUT1, VGLUT2, and VGLUT3, that are responsible for packaging glutamate - the most abundant excitatory neurotransmitter in the brain - into synaptic vesicles. These antiporters vary by location. VGLUT1 is found in areas of the brain related to higher cognitive functions, such as the neocortex. VGLUT2 works to regulate basic physiological functions and is expressed in subcortical regions such as the brainstem and hypothalamus. Finally, VGLUT3 can be seen in neurons that also express other neurotransmitters.

VMAT2 has been found to contribute to neurological conditions such as mood disorders and Parkinson's disease. Studies done on an animal model of clinical depression showed that functional alterations of VMAT2 were associated with depression. The nucleus accumbens, pars compacta of the substantia nigra, and ventral tegmental area - all subregions of the brain involved in clinical depression - were found to have lower VMAT2 levels. The likely cause for this is VMAT's relationship with serotonin and norepinephrine, neurotransmitters that are related to depression. VMAT dysfunction may contribute to the altered levels of these neurotransmitters that occur in mood disorders.

Lower expression of VMAT2 was found to correlate with a higher susceptibility to Parkinson's disease and the antiporter's mRNA was found in all cell groups damaged by Parkinson's. This is likely because VMAT2 dysfunction can lead to a decrease in dopamine packaging into vesicles, accounting for the dopamine depletion that characterizes the disease. For this reason, the antiporter has been identified as a protective factor that could be targeted for the prevention of Parkinson's.

Because alterations in glutamate release have been linked to the generation of seizures in epilepsy, alterations in the function of VGLUT may be implicated. A study was conducted where the VGLUT1 gene was inactivated in the astrocytes and neurons of an animal model. When the gene was inactivated in astrocytes, there was an 80% loss in the antiporter protein itself and, in turn, a reduction in glutamate uptake. The mice in this condition experienced seizures, lower body mass, and higher mortality rates. The researchers concluded that VGLUT1 function in astrocytes is therefore critical to epilepsy resistance and normal weight gain.

There is a lot of evidence that the glutamate system plays a role in long-term cell growth and synaptic plasticity. Disturbances of these processes has been linked to the pathology of mood disorders. The link between the function of the glutamatergic neurotransmitter system and mood disorders sets up VGLUT as one of the targets for treatment.

== See also ==
- Active transport
- Adenine nucleotide translocator
- Cotransporter
- Reduced folate carrier family
- Sodium-calcium exchanger
- Sodium-hydrogen antiporter
- Symporter
- Uniporter
- Vesicular monoamine transporter
