= Binding protein =

A binding protein is any protein that acts as an agent to bind two or more molecules together.

Examples include:

- DNA-binding protein
  - Single-strand binding protein
  - Telomere-binding protein
- RNA-binding protein
  - Poly(A)-binding protein
  - Nuclear cap-binding protein complex
- CREB-binding protein
- Calcium-binding protein
  - Calcium-binding protein 1
  - S100 calcium-binding protein A1
- TATA-binding protein
- Actin-binding protein

Most actin binding proteins bind on the actin surface, despite having different functions and structures.

- Penicillin binding proteins
- Retinol binding protein
  - Retinol binding protein 4
- EP300
- Binding immunoglobulin protein
- Odorant binding protein
- Lipopolysaccharide-binding protein
- C4b-binding protein
- Rap GTP-binding protein
- Calmodulin-binding proteins
- Iron-binding proteins
- Thyroxine-binding proteins
- Folate-binding protein
- Sterol regulatory element-binding protein
- GTP-binding protein
- Retinaldehyde-binding protein 1
- Ccaat-enhancer-binding proteins
- Androgen-binding protein
- Maltose-binding protein
- Phosphatidylethanolamine binding protein 1
- Syntaxin binding protein 3
- Insulin-like growth factor-binding protein
- Methyl-CpG-binding domain protein 2
- Growth hormone-binding protein
- Vitamin D-binding protein
- Syntaxin binding protein 2
- Oxysterol-binding protein
- E3 binding protein
- Iron-responsive element-binding protein
- Polypyrimidine tract-binding protein
- Fatty acid-binding protein
- Myosin binding protein C, cardiac
- CPE binding protein

== See also ==
- 4EGI-1, a binding inhibitor
