= Sodium-transporting carboxylic acid decarboxylase =

Family of porters that belong to the CPA superfamily

The Na^{+}-transporting Carboxylic Acid Decarboxylase (NaT-DC) Family (TC# 3.B.1) is a family of porters that belong to the CPA superfamily. Members of this family have been characterized in both Gram-positive and Gram-negative bacteria. A representative list of proteins belonging to the NaT-DC family can be found in the Transporter Classification Database.

== Function ==
Porters of the NaT-DC family catalyze decarboxylation of a substrate carboxylic acid and use the energy released to drive extrusion of one or two sodium ions (Na^{+}) from the cytoplasm of the cell. These systems have been characterized only from bacteria.

The generalized reaction for the NaT-DC family is:

R - CO^{−}_{2} (in) + H^{+} (out) and 1 or 2 Na^{+} (in) ←→ R-H + CO_{2} (in) and 1 or 2 Na^{+} (out).

Distinct enzymes catalyze decarboxylation of (1) oxaloacetate, (2) methylmalonyl-CoA, (3) glutaconyl-CoA and (4) malonate. The oxaloacetate decarboxylases (EC 4.1.1.3; TC# 3.B.1.1.1), methylmalonyl CoA decarboxylases (EC 4.1.1.4; TC# 3.B.1.1.2) and malonate decarboxylases (TC# 3.B.1.1.4) are homologous.

== Composition ==
Glutaconyl-CoA decarboxylase (EC 4.1.1.70; TC# 3.B.1.1.3) consists of four subunits: α (GcdA, 587 amino acyl residues (aas); catalytic subunit), β (GcdB, 375 aas; 9 TMSs; Na^{+}-transporter subunit), γ (GcdC, 145 aas; biotin-carrier subunit) and δ (GcdD, 107 aas; 1 TMS; the GcdA anchor protein). The catalytic subunit of all four enzyme porters are biotin-containing multi-subunit enzymes. The α-δ subunits of these enzymes are homologous to proteins encoded within the genomes of archaea, such as Pyrococcus abyssi (Cohen et al., 2003). Consequently, NaT-DC family members may be present in archaea as well as bacteria.

The α-subunits of the oxaloacetate and methylmalonyl-CoA decarboxylases are homologous to many biotin-containing enzymes including (1) pyruvate carboxylases, (2) homocitrate synthases, (3) biotin carboxyl carrier proteins, (4) isopropylmalate synthases and (5) acyl-CoA carboxylase. The α-subunit of the glutaconate decarboxylase is homologous to propionyl-CoA carboxylase. The crystal structure of the carboxyltransferase at 1.7 Å resolution shows a dimer of TIM barrels with an active site metal ion, identified spectroscopically as Zn^{2+}.

== Structure ==
The high resolution crystal structure of the α-subunit of the glutaconyl-CoA decarboxylase (Gcdα) of Acidaminococcus fermentans (TC# 3.B.1.1.3) has been solved (3GF3). The active site of the dimeric enzyme lies at the interface between the two monomers. The N-terminal domain binds the glutaconyl-CoA, and the C-terminal domain binds the biotinyl lysine moiety. The enzyme transfers CO_{2} from glutaconyl-CoA to a biotin carrier protein (the γ-subunit) that is subsequently decarboxylated by the carboxybiotin decarboxylation site within the Na^{+} pumping beta subunit (Gcdβ). A proposed structure of the holoenzyme positions the water-filled central channel of the Gcdα dimer coaxial with the ion channel in Gcdβ. The central channel is blocked by arginines, which could allow Na^{+} passage by conformational movement or by entry through two side channels.

The β-subunits possess 9 transmembrane α-helical spanners (TMSs). The protein may dip into the membrane twice between TMSs III and IV. The most conserved regions are segments IIIa, the first membrane loop following TMS III, and TMS VIII. Conserved residues therein, D203 (IIIa), Y229 (IV) and N373, G377, S382 and R389 (VIII), provide Na^{+} binding sites and the translocation pathway. D203 and S382 may provide two binding sites for the two Na^{+} ions. D203 is absolutely essential for function and may provide the primary intramembranous Na^{+}-binding site. The beta subunits of these transporters show sufficient sequence similarity to the Na^{+}:H^{+} antiporters of the CPA2 family (TC #2.A.37) to establish homology (K. Studley and M.H. Saier, Jr., unpublished results).

== See also ==
- Decarboxylase
- Membrane proteins
- Transport proteins
- Transporter Classification Database
