= CPA superfamily =

Transport protein superfamily

The cation:proton antiporter (CPA) superfamily is a superfamily of transport proteins named after one of its constituent members, the monovalent cation:proton antiporter-2 (CPA2).

CPA1 was considered a member of the superfamily until 2010, when it was discovered to in fact be a member of the VIC superfamily. As of April 2016, the CPA superfamily consists of four members:

- Monovalent cation:proton antiporter-2 family
- Malonate:Sodium symporter family
- Putative sulfate exporter family
- Sodium-transporting carboxylic acid decarboxylase family

Structural variation exists between families. For example, members of the CPA2 family are between 300 and 900 amino acyl residues (aas) in length and exhibit 10 to 14 transmembrane segments (TMSs), while members of the MSS family are shorter than 300 aas and exhibit 4 to 7 TMSs.

== See also ==
- Transporter Classification Database
