= Mrp superfamily =

Large group of transport proteins

The Na^{+} Transporting Mrp Superfamily is a superfamily of integral membrane transport proteins.

It includes the TC families:

2.A.63 - The Monovalent Cation (K^{+} or Na^{+}):Proton Antiporter-3 (CPA3) Family

3.D.1 - The H^{+} or Na^{+}-translocating NADH Dehyrogenase (NDH) Family

3.D.9 - The H^{+}-translocating F_{420}H_{2} Dehydrogenase (F_{420}H_{2}DH) Family

Mrp of Bacillus subtilis is a 7 subunit Na^{+}/H^{+} antiporter complex (TC# 2.A.63.1.4). All subunits are homologous to the subunits in other members of this monovalent cation (K^{+} or Na^{+}):proton antiporter-3 (CPA3) family as well as subunits in the archaeal hydrogenases (TC#s 3.D.1.4.1 and 3.D.1.4.2), which share several subunits with NADH dehydrogenase subunits (3.D.1). The largest subunits of the Mrp complex (MrpA and MrpD) are homologous to subunits in NADH dehydrogenases (NDHs): ND2, ND4 and ND5 in the fungal NADH dehydrogenase complex and most other NDHs, as well as subunits in the F_{420}H_{2} dehydrogenase of Methanosarcina mazei (TC#3.D.9.1.1). These homologous subunits may catalyze Na^{+}/K^{+} and/or H^{+} transport.

== See also ==
- Transporter Classification Database
