= Propionyl coenzyme A carboxylase =

Propionyl coenzyme A carboxylase may refer to the following enzymes:

- Methylmalonyl-CoA decarboxylase
- Propionyl-CoA carboxylase
