= Putative sulfate exporter =

Protein family

The Putative Sulfate Exporter (PSE) Family (TC# 2.A.98) is composed of several putative 10 or 11 transmembrane segment (TMS) proteins. This family is part of the CPA superfamily and its members are found in diverse bacteria and archaea. The genes encoding some of these homologues may be induced by growth in the presence of cysteate (suyZ) or taurine (tauZ). Although they differ in structure, these proteins are most closely related to the 12 TMS members of the CPA superfamily and exhibit demonstrable homology to the MadML malonate:H^{+} symporter (TC #2.A.70), although their sequence similarity is low.

== See also ==
- Transporter Classification Database
