= Malonyl-S-ACP decarboxylase =

Identifiers
- EC no.: 4.1.1.87

Databases
- IntEnz: IntEnz view
- BRENDA: BRENDA entry
- ExPASy: NiceZyme view
- KEGG: KEGG entry
- MetaCyc: metabolic pathway
- PRIAM: profile
- PDB structures: RCSB PDB PDBe PDBsum
Search
- PMC: articles
- PubMed: articles
- NCBI: proteins

Malonyl-S-ACP decarboxylase (EC 4.1.1.87, malonyl-S-acyl-carrier protein decarboxylase, MdcD/MdcE, MdcD,E) is an enzyme with systematic name malonyl-(acyl-carrier-protein) carboxy-lyase. This enzyme catalyses the following chemical reaction

a malonyl-[acyl-carrier protein] + H^{+} $\rightleftharpoons$ an acetyl-[acyl-carrier protein] + CO_{2}

This enzyme comprises the beta and gamma subunits of the enzyme EC 4.1.1.88.
