= Sodium–hydrogen antiporter =

Na^{+}/H^{+} antiporter 1
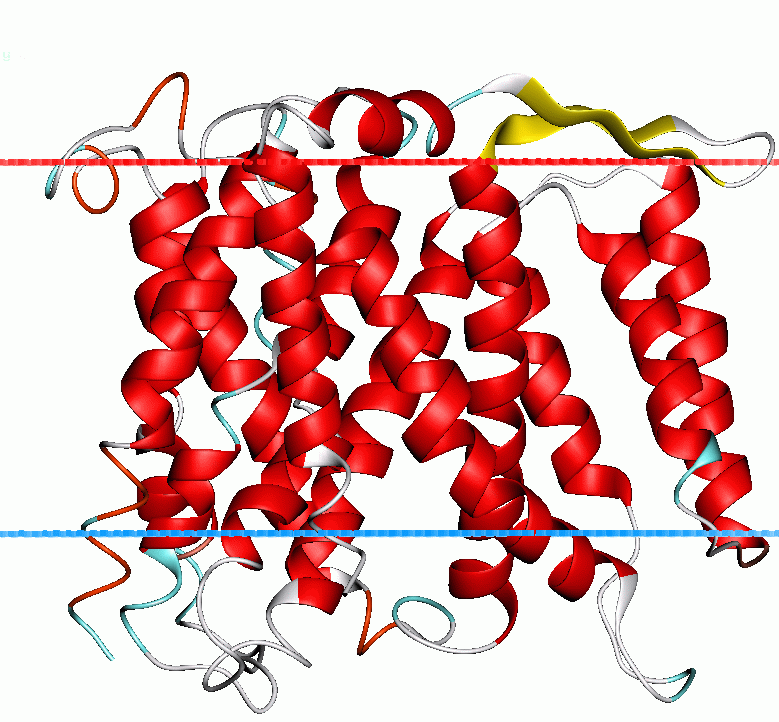

Identifiers
- Symbol: Na_H_antiport_1
- Pfam: PF06965
- InterPro: IPR004670
- TCDB: 2.A.36
- OPM superfamily: 106
- OPM protein: 1zcd
Available protein structures:
- PDB: IPR004670 PF06965 (ECOD; PDBsum)
- AlphaFold: IPR004670; PF06965

The sodium–hydrogen antiporter or sodium–proton exchanger (Na+/H+ exchanger or NHX) is a membrane protein that transports Na^{+} into the cell, and H^{+} out of the cell (antiport).

The pump is located in the intercalated cells of the collecting duct and in the epithelial cells of the proximal convoluted tubule. The membrane pump is primarily responsible for maintaining homeostasis of pH and sodium. Angiotensin II upregulates in the proximal convoluted tubule to promote Na^{+} and bicarbonate reabsorption.

== Clinical significance ==
Defects in Na+/H+ antiporters may result in heart or kidney failure. Na+/H+ exchangers are thought to be implicated in other disorders such as hypertension. In one study, transgenic mice over expressing this membrane protein were shown to have increased reabsorption and retention of sodium after increased salt intake.

== Research ==
In dopamine receptor signalling, the Na+/H+ exchanger NHE-1 is activated downstream of the D2, D3, and D4 receptors.

== Isoforms ==
There are several isoforms of the antiporter:

- Sodium–hydrogen antiporter 1
- Sodium–hydrogen antiporter 2
- Sodium–hydrogen antiporter 3
- Sodium–hydrogen antiporter 4
- Sodium–hydrogen antiporter 5
- Sodium–hydrogen antiporter 6
- Sodium–hydrogen antiporter 7
- Sodium–hydrogen antiporter 8
- Sodium–hydrogen antiporter 9

== Families ==
There are several families of sodium/proton antiporters that facilitate the exchange of sodium ions with protons across the lipid membrane. Some of them include:

- TC# 2.A.33 - Na^{+}:H^{+} Antiporter (NhaA) Family
- TC# 2.A.34 - Na^{+}:H^{+} Antiporter (NhaB) Family
- TC# 2.A.35 - Na^{+}:H^{+} Antiporter (NhaC) Family
- TC# 2.A.36 - Monovalent Cation:Proton Antiporter-1 (CPA1) Family
- TC# 2.A.37 - Monovalent Cation:Proton Antiporter-2 (CPA2) Family
- TC# 2.A.62 - Na^{+}:H^{+} Antiporter (NhaD) Family
- TC# 2.A.63 - Monovalent Cation (K^{+} or Na^{+}):Proton Antiporter-3 (CPA3) Family
- TC# 2.A.111 - Na^{+}:H^{+} Antiporter (NhaE) Family
