= Malonate:Sodium symporter =

Family of transport proteins

The Malonate:Na^{+} Symporter (MSS) Family (TC# 2.A.70) is a group of transport proteins belonging to the CPA superfamily. These proteins are composites with constituents ranging in size from 129 to 255 amino acyl residues (aas) and exhibiting 4 to 7 transmembrane segments (TMSs). A representative list of proteins belonging to the MSS family can be found in the Transporter Classification Database.

== MadLM ==
One constituent member of the MSS family, the monobasic malonate:Na^{+} symporter of Malonomonas rubra, has been functionally and genetically characterized. It consists of two integral membrane proteins, MadL (129 aas; accession number O06931) and MadM (255 aas; accession number O06932) which exhibit 4 and 7 putative transmembrane spanners, respectively. The transporter is believed to catalyze the electroneutral reversible uptake of H^{+}-malonate with one Na^{+}, and both subunits have been shown to be essential for activity. There is a close two-subunit homologue in Pseudomonas putida, which is encoded within the malonate decarboxylase gene cluster of this organism. The NapA Na^{+}/H^{+} antiporter of Enterococcus hirae (CPA2 family; TC #2.A.37) also appears to be distantly related to MadM.

The transport reaction catalyzed by MadLM is:

H^{+} malonate (out) + Na^{+} (out) ⇌ H^{+} malonate (in) + Na^{+} (in).

== See also ==
- Transporter Classification Database
