= NhaC family =

Family of transport proteins

The NhaC family (TC# 2.A.35) belongs to the Ion Transporter (IT) Superfamily. A representative list of proteins belonging to the NhaC family can be found in the Transporter Classification Database.

Two members of the NhaC family have been functionally characterized. One is believed to be a Na^{+}:H^{+} antiporter; the other is a malate·H^{+}:lactate·Na^{+} antiporter. Several paralogues are found in Vibrio cholerae, and two paralogues are found encoded in the completely sequenced genomes of bothHaemophilus influenzae and Bacillus subtilis. E. coli lacks such a homologue. Pyrococcus species also have at least one homologue each. Thus, members of the NhaC family are found in both Gram-negative bacteria and Gram-positive bacteria as well as archaea. NhaC of B. firmus is 462 amino acyl residues long and possesses 12 putative transmembrane α-helical segments. MleN of B. subtilis (468 aas; TC# 2.A.35.1.2) also exhibits 12 putative TMSs.

The transport reaction catalyzed by NhaC is probably:

Na+ (in) + nH+ (out) ⇌ Na+ (out) + nH+ (in). (n > 1)

That catalyzed by MleN is probably:

Malate (out) + H^{+} (out) + Lactate (in) + Na^{+} (in) ⇌ Malate (in) + H^{+} (in) + Lactate (out) + Na^{+} (out)

== See also ==
- Sodium-Proton antiporter
- Antiporter
- Transporter Classification Database
