= NhaD family =

Family of transport proteins

The NhaD family (TC# 2.A.62) belongs to the Ion Transporter (IT) Superfamily. A representative list of proteins belonging to the NhaD family can be found in the Transporter Classification Database.

The NhaD Na^{+}/H^{+} antiporter has been characterized from two Vibrio species: V. parahaemolyticus and V. cholerae and in the haloalkaliphile, Alkalimonas amylolytica. These proteins and their homologues are 400-500 aas long and exhibit 10-13 TMSs. They catalyze Na^{+}/H^{+} and Li^{+}/H^{+} antiport. They exhibit activity at basic pH (8-10) with no activity at pH 7.5. The Amylolytica antiporter has low Na^{+} affinity and has optimal activity at 600 mM Na^{+}. Homologues are found in Pseudomonadota of all groups, Flavobacteriia, and Chlamydia. Distant homologues of the IT superfamily are ubiquitous.

The generalized reaction catalyzed by NhaD is:

nH^{+} (in) + mNa^{+} (out) ⇌ nH^{+} (out) + mNa^{+} (in).

== See also ==
- Sodium-Proton antiporter
- Antiporter
- Transporter Classification Database
