= Oxaloacetate decarboxylase =

Enzyme

oxaloacetate decarboxylase

Identifiers
- EC no.: 4.1.1.3
- CAS no.: 9024-98-0

Databases
- BRENDA: enzyme data
- ExPASy: NiceZyme view
- KEGG: enzyme entry
- MetaCyc: metabolic pathway
- Rhea: reactions
- PDB structures: RCSB PDB PDBe PDBsum
- Gene Ontology: AmiGO / QuickGO
Search
- PMC: articles
- PubMed: articles
- NCBI: proteins

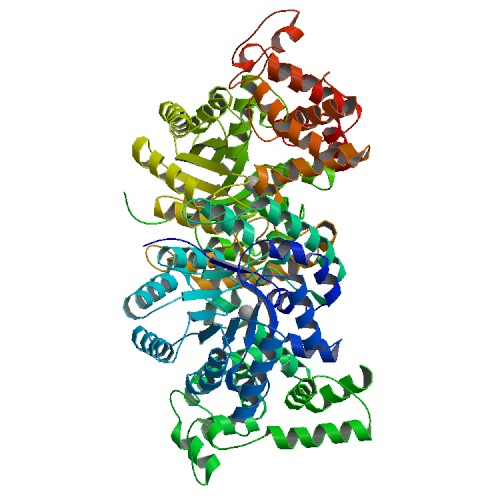
Crystal structure of the carboxyltransferase domain of the oxaloacetate decarboxylase Na+ pump from Vibrio cholerae

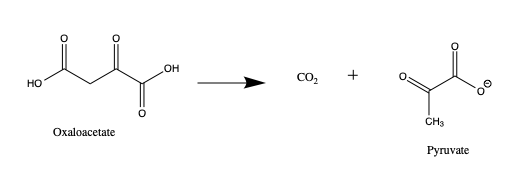
Oxaloacetate decarboxylase catalyzes the break down of oxaloacetate into pyruvate and carbon dioxide

Na+-transporting oxaloacetate decarboxylase beta subunit

Identifiers
- Symbol: OAD_beta
- Pfam: PF03977
- Pfam clan: CL0064
- InterPro: IPR005661
- TCDB: 3.B.1
Available protein structures:
- PDB: IPR005661 PF03977 (ECOD; PDBsum)
- AlphaFold: IPR005661; PF03977

Oxaloacetate decarboxylase, gamma chain

Identifiers
- Symbol: OAD_gamma
- Pfam: PF04277
- InterPro: IPR005899
- TCDB: 3.B.1
Available protein structures:
- PDB: IPR005899 PF04277 (ECOD; PDBsum)
- AlphaFold: IPR005899; PF04277

Oxaloacetate decarboxylase is a carboxy-lyase involved in the conversion of oxaloacetate into pyruvate.

It is categorized under EC 4.1.1.3.

Oxaloacetate decarboxylase activity in a given organism may be due to activity of malic enzyme, pyruvate kinase, malate dehydrogenase, pyruvate carboxylase and PEP carboxykinase or the activity of "real" oxaloacetate decarboxylases. The latter enzymes catalyze the irreversible decarboxylation of oxaloacetate and can be classified into (i) the divalent cation-dependent oxaloacetate decarboxylases and (ii) the membrane-bound sodium-dependent and biotin-containing oxaloacetate decarboxylases from enterobacteria.

== Kinetic Properties ==
An oxaloacetate decarboxylase from the family of divalent cation dependent decarboxylases was isolated from Corynebacterium glutamicum in 1995 by Jetten et al. This enzyme selectively catalyzed the decarboxylation of oxaloacetate to pyruvate and CO_{2} with a Km of 2.1mM, Vmax of 158 umol, and kcat of 311 s^-1. Mn2+ was required for enzymatic activity with a Km of 1.2mM for Mn2+.

A oxaloacetate decarboxylase found in mitochondria and soluble cytoplasm was isolated and purified from rat liver cells in 1974 by Wojtcak et al. The enzyme was not activated by divalent cations nor inhibited by chelating agents. The determined Km value was 0.55mM and the pH optimum for the enzyme between 6.5 and 7.5.

== Cytoplasmic Enzymes ==
Found in different microorganisms such as Pseudomonas, Acetobacter, C. glutamicum, Veillonella parvula, and A. vinelandii, cytoplasmic oxaloacetate decarboxylases are dependent on the presence of divalent cations such as Mn^{2+}, Co^{2+}, Mg^{2+}, Ni^{2+}, or Ca^{2+}. These enzymes are inhibited by acetyl-CoA and ADP.

== Membrane-Bound Enzymes ==
Membrane bound oxaloacetate decarboxylase was the first enzyme of the Na+ transport decarboxylase family demonstrated to act as primary Na+ pump. This enzyme family includes methylmalonyl-CoA decarboxylase, malonate decarboxylase, and glutanoyl-CoA decarboxylase, all of which are found exclusively in anaerobic bacteria.

Decarboxylating the beta-keto acid of oxaloacetate affords the necessary free energy to pump sodium ions across the lipid bilayer. The resulting sodium gradient drives the synthesis of ATP, solute transport, and motility. The overall reaction catalyzed by the pump is the exchange of two intracellular Na+ ions for one extra cellular H+ ion; the reaction is initiated by the enzyme-catalyzed decarboxylation of oxaloacetate in the carboxyltransferase domain of the alpha subunit, yielding pyruvate and carboxybiotin. The oxaloacetate decarboxylase pump is also reversible: at high concentrations of extracellular Na+, the pump will couple downhill movement of Na+ into the cytosol with the carboxylation of pyruvate to form oxaloacetate.

Members of this family of enzymes are typically trimers, composed of alpha, beta and gamma subunits. The beta and gamma subunits are integral membrane proteins. The ~45kDa beta subunit has nine transmembrane segments which serve to couple the decarboxylation of the carboxybiotin to the translocation of Na+ from the cytoplasm to the periplasm. The small ~9kDa gamma subunit is an integral membrane protein with a single helix at the N-terminus, followed by a hydrophilic C-terminal domain which interacts with the alpha subunit. The gamma subunit is essential for the overall stability of the complex, and likely serves as an anchor to hold the alpha and beta subunits in place. Furthermore, the gamma subunit significantly accelerates the rate of oxaloacetate decarboxylation in the alpha subunit, and this correlates with the coordination of a Zn2+ metal ion by several residues at the hydrophilic C-terminus.

The alpha subunit, which is ~65kDa, is a biotinylated peripheral membrane protein on the cytosolic side of the membrane. Within the alpha subunit is the carboxyl transferase (CT) domain, oxaloacetate decarboxylase gamma association domain, and biotin carboxyl carrier domain. The crystal structure of the CT domain forms a TIM barrel fold in a dimer formation that coordinates with a Zn2+ ion in a catalytic site. The enzyme is completely inactivated by specific mutagenesis of Asp17, His207, and His209, which serve as ligands for the Zn2+ metal ion, or by Lys178 near the active site, suggesting that Zn2+ as well as Lys178 are essential for catalysis.

== See also ==
- Pyruvate carboxylase
