= Sodium–hydrogen antiporter 1 =

Protein found in humans

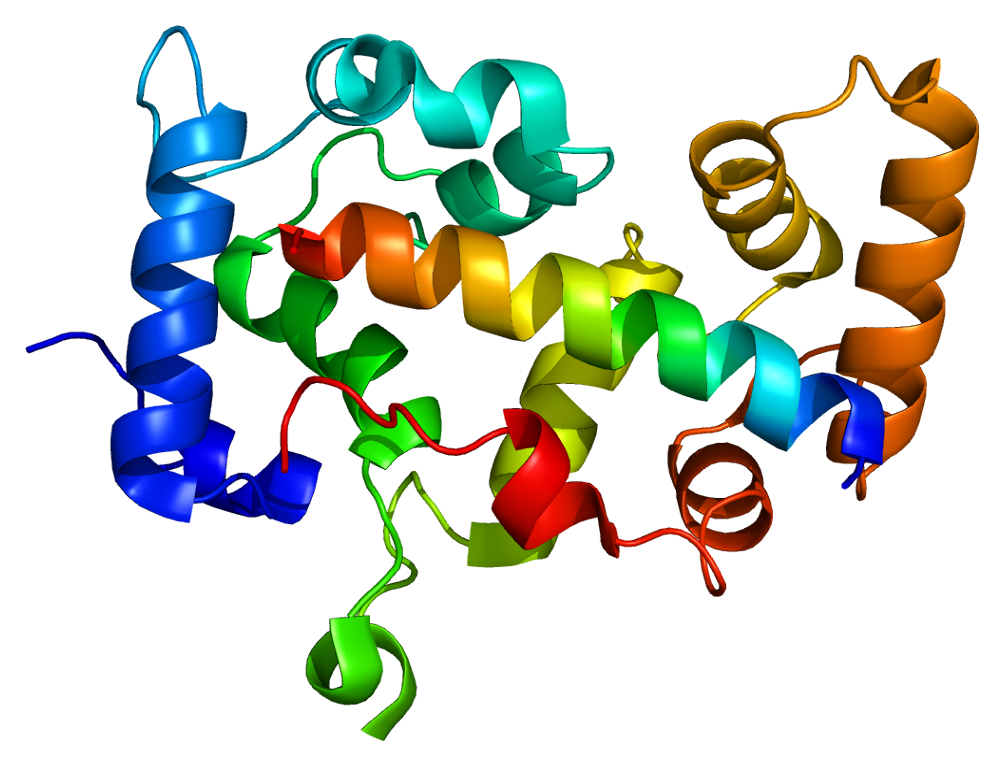

Identifiers
- Aliases: SLC9A1, APNH, NHE-1, NHE1, PPP1R143, LIKNS, solute carrier family 9 member A1
- External IDs: OMIM: 107310; MGI: 102462; GeneCards: SLC9A1
Available structures
PDB	Ortholog search: PDBe RCSB
PDB	List of PDB id codes 1Y4E, 2BEC, 2E30, 2KBV, 2L0E, 2MDF, 2YGG

Gene location (Human)
Chr.	Chromosome 1 (human)
Band	1p36.11	Start	27,098,809 bp
Band	1p36.11	End	27,166,981 bp

Gene location (Mouse)
Chr.	Chromosome 4 (mouse)
Band	4 D2.3|4 66.25 cM	Start	133,097,017 bp
Band	4 D2.3|4 66.25 cM	End	133,151,013 bp
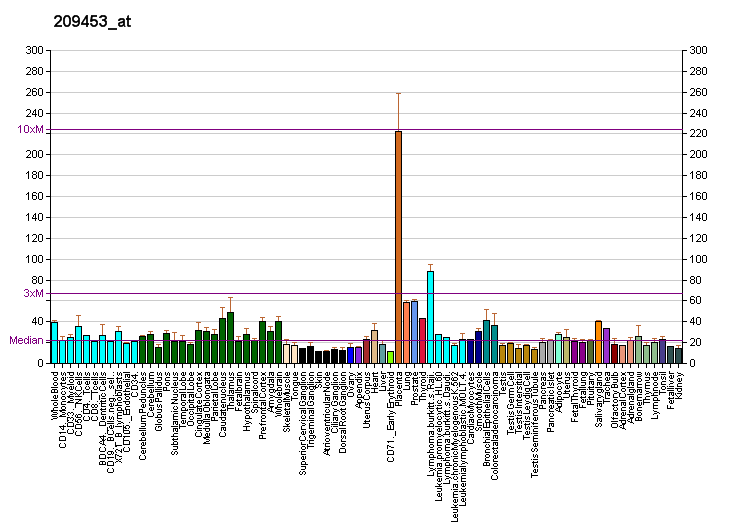
RNA expression pattern
Bgee	Human / Mouse (ortholog); Top expressed in: parotid gland; mucosa of transverse colon; oocyte; placenta; body of stomach; stromal cell of endometrium; pylorus; putamen; mucosa of urinary bladder; nasal epithelium / Top expressed in: epithelium of stomach; zygote; ankle joint; pyloric antrum; secondary oocyte; mucous cell of stomach; gastrula; granulocyte; decidua; lip; More reference expression data
BioGPS	More reference expression data
Gene ontology
Molecular function	protein-macromolecule adaptor activity; calcium-dependent protein binding; phosphatidylinositol-4,5-bisphosphate binding; antiporter activity; solute:proton antiporter activity; sodium:proton antiporter activity involved in regulation of cardiac muscle cell membrane potential; calmodulin binding; protein binding; molecular adaptor activity; protein phosphatase 2B binding; sodium:proton antiporter activity; potassium:proton antiporter activity
Cellular component	cytoplasm; membrane; focal adhesion; T-tubule; mitochondrion; perinuclear region of cytoplasm; cation-transporting ATPase complex; cell surface; apical plasma membrane; endoplasmic reticulum; membrane raft; extracellular exosome; lamellipodium; integral component of membrane; intercalated disc; plasma membrane; nucleoplasm; endoplasmic reticulum membrane; integral component of plasma membrane; basolateral plasma membrane; sarcolemma
Biological process	regulation of cardiac muscle contraction by calcium ion signaling; regulation of sensory perception of pain; positive regulation of the force of heart contraction; positive regulation of cardiac muscle hypertrophy; cellular response to epinephrine stimulus; positive regulation of action potential; cellular response to mechanical stimulus; maintenance of cell polarity; cellular response to hypoxia; positive regulation of mitochondrial membrane permeability; response to muscle stretch; proton transmembrane transport; cellular sodium ion homeostasis; cardiac muscle cell differentiation; ion transport; positive regulation of cell growth; cellular response to insulin stimulus; regulation of focal adhesion assembly; regulation of cardiac muscle cell membrane potential; response to acidic pH; cell differentiation; regulation of the force of heart contraction; cellular response to organic cyclic compound; cellular response to acidic pH; cation transport; negative regulation of apoptotic process; regulation of the force of heart contraction by cardiac conduction; regulation of pH; cardiac muscle cell contraction; neuron death; hyaluronan catabolic process; response to organic cyclic compound; sodium ion transport; regulation of intracellular pH; positive regulation of intracellular signal transduction; regulation of stress fiber assembly; positive regulation of calcineurin-NFAT signaling cascade; protein complex oligomerization; sodium ion import across plasma membrane; positive regulation of apoptotic process; cellular response to antibiotic; positive regulation of calcium:sodium antiporter activity; cell migration; positive regulation of transcription by RNA polymerase II; cellular response to electrical stimulus; potassium ion transmembrane transport; transmembrane transport; transport; cellular response to cold; sodium ion export across plasma membrane; anion transmembrane transport; sodium ion transmembrane transport
Sources:Amigo / QuickGO
Orthologs
Databases	NCBI: entry; OMA: entry
Species	Human	Mouse
Entrez	6548	20544
Ensembl	ENSG00000090020	ENSMUSG00000028854
UniProt	P19634	Q61165
RefSeq (mRNA)	NM_003047	NM_016981; NM_001358455
RefSeq (protein)	NP_003038	NP_058677; NP_001345384
Location (UCSC)	Chr 1: 27.1 – 27.17 Mb	Chr 4: 133.1 – 133.15 Mb
PubMed search
- Wikidata
View/Edit Human	View/Edit Mouse

The sodium-hydrogen antiporter 1 (NHE-1) also known as sodium/hydrogen exchanger 1 or SLC9A1 (SoLute Carrier family 9A1) is an isoform of sodium–hydrogen antiporter that in humans is encoded by the SLC9A1 gene.

== Function ==
The Na^{+}/H^{+} antiporter (SLC9A1) is a ubiquitous membrane-bound enzyme involved in volume- and pH-regulation of vertebrate cells. It is inhibited by the non-specific diuretic drug amiloride and activated by a variety of signals including growth factors, mitogens, neurotransmitters, tumor promoters, and others.

== Interactions ==
Sodium–hydrogen antiporter 1 has been shown to interact with carbonic anhydrase II and CHP. It is also the target of the experimental drug rimeporide, which is being developed for the treatment of Duchenne muscular dystrophy.
