= Monovalent cation:proton antiporter-3 =

Family of transport proteins

The Monovalent Cation (K^{+} or Na^{+}):Proton Antiporter-3 (CPA3) Family (TC# 2.A.63) is a member of the Na^{+} transporting Mrp superfamily. The CPA3 family consists of bacterial multicomponent K^{+}:H^{+} and Na^{+}:H^{+} antiporters. The best characterized systems are the PhaABCDEFG system of Sinorhizobium meliloti (TC# 2.A.63.1.1) that functions in pH adaptation and as a K^{+} efflux system, and the MnhABCDEFG system of Staphylococcus aureus (TC# 2.A.63.1.3) that functions as a Na^{+} efflux Na^{+}:H^{+} antiporter.

== Homology ==
A homologous, but only partially sequenced, system was earlier reported to catalyze Na^{+}:H^{+} antiport in an alkalophilic Bacillus strain. PhaA and PhaD are respectively homologous to the ND5 and ND4 subunits of the H^{+}-pumping NADH:ubiquinone oxidoreductase (TC #3.D.1). Homologous protein subunits from E. coli NADH:quinone oxidoreductase can functionally replace MrpA and MrpD in Bacillus subtilis.

Homologues of PhaA, B, C and D and Nha1, 2, 3 and 4 of an alkalophilic Bacillus strain are the Yuf(Mrp)T, U, V and D genes of Bacillus subtilis. In this system, YufT is believed to be responsible for Na^{+}:H^{+} antiporter activity, but it does not have activity in the absence of other constituents of the operon.

== Structure ==
The seven Pha proteins are of the following sizes (in #aas) and exhibit the following putative numbers of transmembrane α-helical spanners (TMSs):

- PhaA - 725 and 17
- PhaB - 257 and 5
- PhaC - 115 and 3
- PhaD - 547 and 13
- PhaE - 161 and 3
- PhaF - 92 and 3
- PhaG - 120 and 3

All are predicted to be integral membrane proteins.

Corresponding values for the S. aureus Mnh system are:

- MnhA - 801 and 18
- MnhB - 142 and 4
- MnhC - 113 and 3
- MnhD - 498 and 13
- MnhE - 159 and 4
- MnhF - 97 and 3
- MnhG - 118 and 3

In view of the complexity of the system, large variation in subunit structure, and the homology with NDH family protein constituents, a complicated energy coupling mechanism, possibly involving a redox reaction, cannot be ruled out.

== Function ==
Na^{+} or Li^{+} does, but K^{+}, Ca^{2+}, and Mg^{2+} do not, support significant antiport by the Gram-positive bacterial systems (TC# 2.A.6.3.1.2 and TC# 2.A.6.3.1.3). Na^{+}(Li^{+})/H^{+} antiporters have alkaline pH optima and apparent K_{m} values for Na^{+} that are among the lowest reported for bacterial Na^{+}/H^{+} antiporters. Na^{+}/H^{+}antiport consumes the pmf and therefore is probably electrogenic.

YufF (MrpF) appears to catalyze cholate efflux, possibly by a Na^{+} symport mechanism. It plays a major role in Na^{+} extrusion and is required for initiation of sporulation. Additionally, another component of the operon, MrpF (equivalent to PhaF of R. meliloti) has been implicated in choline and Na^{+} efflux. The MrpA-G proteins of B. subtilis have been shown to be present in a single multicomponent complex. They provide Na^{+}/H^{+} antiport activity and function in multiple compound resistance and pH homeostasis.

=== Transport Reaction ===
The generalized reaction believed to be catalyzed by CPA3 family members is:

[K^{+} or Na^{+}] (in) + H^{+} (out) ⇌ [K^{+} or Na^{+}] (out) + H^{+} (in).

== See also ==
- Sodium-Proton antiporter
- Monovalent Cation (K^{+} or Na^{+}):Proton Antiporter-1
- Monovalent Cation (K^{+} or Na^{+}):Proton Antiporter-2
- Transporter Classification Database
