= Biostrophin =

Drug for gene therapy

Biostrophin is a drug which may serve as a vehicle for gene therapy, in the treatment of Duchenne and Becker muscular dystrophy.

As mutations in the gene which codes for the protein dystrophin is the underlying defect responsible for both disorders, biostrophin will deliver a genetically-engineered, functional copy of the gene at the molecular level to affected muscle cells. Dosage, as well as a viable means for systemic release of the drug in patients, is currently being investigated with the use of both canine and primate animal models.

Biostrophin is being manufactured by Asklepios BioPharmaceuticals, Inc., with funding provided by the Muscular Dystrophy Association.

== See also ==
=== Other drugs for Duchenne muscular dystrophy ===
- Ataluren
- Rimeporide (experimental)
