= NhaE family =

Family of transport proteins

The NhaE family (TC# 2.A.111) belongs to the Ion Transporter (IT) Superfamily, which has an end. A representative list of proteins belonging to the NhaE family can be found in the Transporter Classification Database.

The NhaH family consists of proteins from Gram-negative bacteria (e.g., Leptospira, Azotobacter, Neisseria, Ralstonia, Chlorobium and Rhizobial species). The proteins are of about 480 aas with 12-14 putative TMSs.

An open reading frame (ORF) from the genome of Neisseria meningitidis displaying similarity with the NhaE type of Na^{+}/H^{+} antiporters was expressed in E. coli and characterized for sodium transport ability. The N. meningitidis antiporter (NmNhaE) was able to complement an E. coli strain devoid of Na^{+}/H^{+} antiporters (KNabc) with respect to the ability to grow in the presence of high concentrations of NaCl or LiCl. Ion transport assays in everted vesicles prepared from the KNabc strain expressing NmNhaE from a plasmid confirmed its ability to translocate Na^{+} and Li^{+}.

The generalized reaction catalyzed by NhaE is,

Na^{+} or Li^{+} (in) + H^{+} (out) ⇌ Na^{+} or Li^{+} (out) + H^{+} (in)

== See also ==
- Sodium-Proton antiporter
- Antiporter
- Transporter Classification Database
