= Malonate decarboxylase =

Malonate decarboxylase may refer to:

- Biotin-independent malonate decarboxylase, an enzyme
- Biotin-dependent malonate decarboxylase, an enzyme
