= NhaA family =

Family of transport proteins

Na^{+}/H^{+} antiporter 1
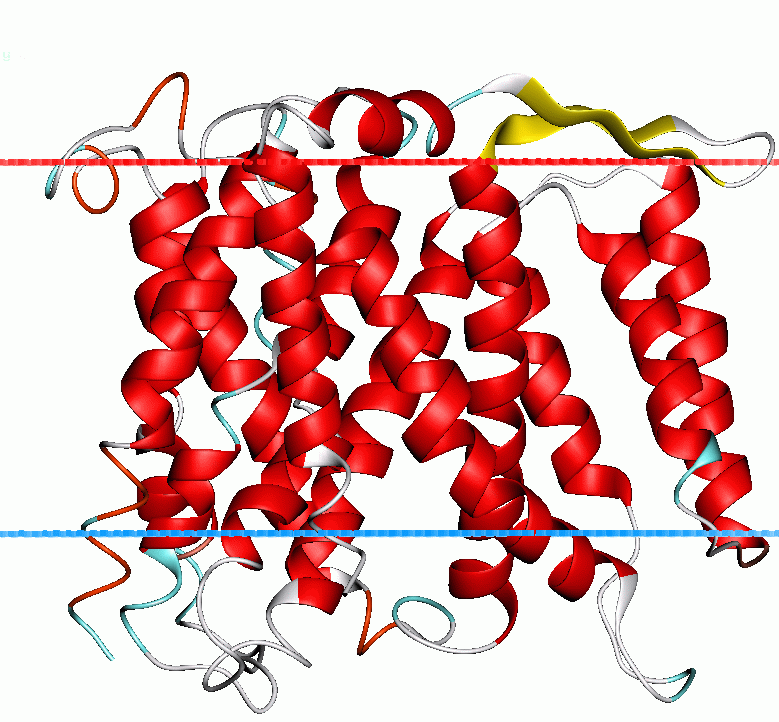

Identifiers
- Symbol: Na_H_antiport_1
- Pfam: PF06965
- InterPro: IPR004670
- TCDB: 2.A.36
- OPM superfamily: 106
- OPM protein: 1zcd
Available protein structures:
- PDB: 1zcdA:4-380,4CZ8 IPR004670 PF06965 (ECOD; PDBsum)
- AlphaFold: IPR004670; PF06965

Na^{+}/H^{+} antiporter A (NhaA) family (TC# 2.A.33) contains a number of bacterial sodium-proton antiporter (SPAP) proteins. These are integral membrane proteins that catalyse the exchange of H^{+} for Na^{+} in a manner that is highly pH dependent. Homologues have been sequenced from a number of bacteria and archaea. Prokaryotes possess multiple paralogues. A representative list of the proteins that belong to the NhaA family can be found in the Transporter Classification Database.

== Structure ==
Proteins of the NhaA family are of 300-700 amino acyl residues in length. NhaA of E. coli is a homeodimer, each subunit consisting of a bundle of 12 tilted transmembrane α-helices (TMSs).

Molecular dynamics simulations of NhaA enabled proposal of an atomically detailed model of antiporter function. Three conserved aspartate residues are key to this proposed mechanism: Asp^{164} (D164) is the Na^{+}-binding site, D163 controls the alternating accessibility of this binding site to the cytoplasm or periplasm, and D133 is crucial for pH regulation.

== Function ==
Na^{+}-H^{+} antiporters are integral membrane proteins that exchange Na^{+} for H^{+} across the cytoplasmic membrane and many intracellular membranes. They are essential for Na^{+}, pH, and volume homeostasis, which are processes crucial for cell viability. The E. coli protein probably functions in the regulation of the internal pH when the external pH is alkaline, and the protein effectively functions as a pH sensor. It also uses the H^{+} gradient to expel Na^{+} from the cell. Its activity is highly pH dependent.

The generalized transport reaction catalyzed by NhaA is:

Na^{+} (in) + 2H^{+} (out) ⇌ Na^{+} (out) + 2H^{+} (in).

== See also ==
- Sodium-Proton antiporter
- Antiporter
- Transporter Classification Database
