= Calcineurin B homologous protein 1 =

Protein found in humans

CHP1
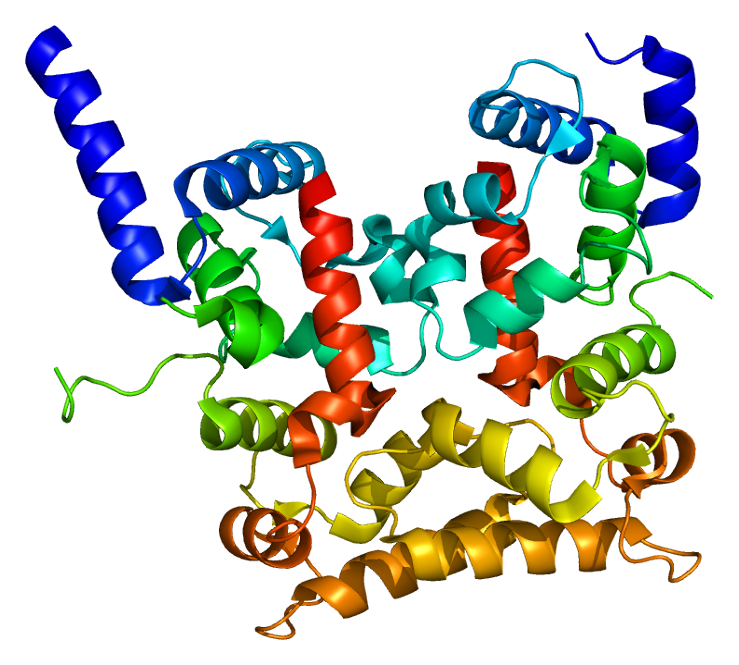

Identifiers
- Aliases: CHP1, CHP, SLC9A1BP, Sid470p, p22, p24, calcineurin like EF-hand protein 1, SPAX9
- External IDs: OMIM: 606988; MGI: 1927185; GeneCards: CHP1
Available structures
PDB	Ortholog search: PDBe RCSB
PDB	List of PDB id codes 2E30

Gene location (Human)
Chr.	Chromosome 15 (human)
Band	15q15.1	Start	41,230,839 bp
Band	15q15.1	End	41,281,887 bp

Gene location (Mouse)
Chr.	Chromosome 2 (mouse)
Band	2|2 E5	Start	119,378,178 bp
Band	2|2 E5	End	119,417,508 bp
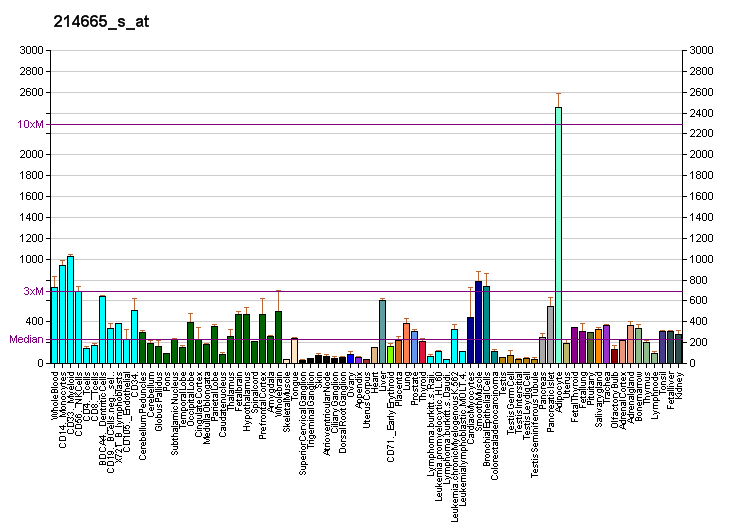

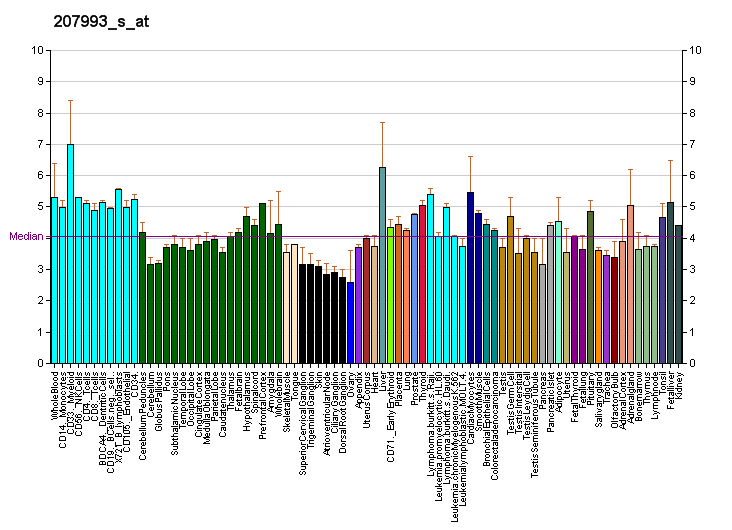
RNA expression pattern
Bgee	Human / Mouse (ortholog); Top expressed in: mucosa of colon; mucosa of sigmoid colon; jejunal mucosa; vulva; mucosa of transverse colon; nasal epithelium; mucosa of ileum; duodenum; mucosa of pharynx; gums / Top expressed in: seminal vesicula; dorsomedial hypothalamic nucleus; decidua; lateral septal nucleus; pontine nuclei; ventral tegmental area; ventromedial nucleus; lobe of prostate; subiculum; anterior amygdaloid area; More reference expression data
BioGPS	More reference expression data
Gene ontology
Molecular function	calcium ion binding; transporter activity; microtubule binding; protein kinase inhibitor activity; metal ion binding; calcium-dependent protein binding; potassium channel regulator activity; kinase binding; protein binding
Cellular component	cytoplasm; cytosol; membrane; focal adhesion; microtubule cytoskeleton; Golgi membrane; plasma membrane; transport vesicle; endoplasmic reticulum; extracellular exosome; cytoskeleton; endomembrane system; nucleus; endoplasmic reticulum-Golgi intermediate compartment
Biological process	negative regulation of protein phosphorylation; positive regulation of protein glycosylation; negative regulation of calcineurin-NFAT signaling cascade; hyaluronan catabolic process; negative regulation of protein autophosphorylation; negative regulation of protein kinase activity; positive regulation of sodium:proton antiporter activity; negative regulation of phosphatase activity; small GTPase mediated signal transduction; protein stabilization; cellular response to acidic pH; membrane fusion; regulation of intracellular pH; positive regulation of protein transport; negative regulation of protein ubiquitination; potassium ion transport; protein complex oligomerization; microtubule bundle formation; cytoplasmic microtubule organization; protein export from nucleus; membrane docking; regulation of neuron death; protein transport; membrane organization; negative regulation of NF-kappaB transcription factor activity; calcium-ion regulated exocytosis; positive regulation of protein targeting to membrane; negative regulation of protein import into nucleus; transport
Sources:Amigo / QuickGO
Orthologs
Databases	NCBI: entry; OMA: entry
Species	Human	Mouse
Entrez	11261	56398
Ensembl	ENSG00000187446	ENSMUSG00000014077
UniProt	Q99653	P61022
RefSeq (mRNA)	NM_007236	NM_019769
RefSeq (protein)	NP_009167	NP_062743
Location (UCSC)	Chr 15: 41.23 – 41.28 Mb	Chr 2: 119.38 – 119.42 Mb
PubMed search
- Wikidata
View/Edit Human	View/Edit Mouse

Calcineurin B homologous protein 1 is a protein encoded in humans by the CHP1 gene (formerly CHP).

== Function ==
The protein encoded by this gene is a phosphoprotein that binds to the sodium-hydrogen exchangers (NHEs). This protein serves as an essential cofactor which supports the physiological activity of NHE family members. It has protein sequence similarity to calcineurin B and it is also known to be an endogenous inhibitor of calcineurin activity.

== Interactions ==
Calcineurin B homologous protein 1 has been shown to interact with

- sodium-hydrogen antiporter 1,
- sodium-hydrogen antiporter 3, and
- sodium-hydrogen anti porter 9.
