= Rimeporide =

Chemical compound

Clinical data
- ATC code: none

Legal status
- Legal status: Experimental

Identifiers
- IUPAC name: N-(2-methyl-4,5-bis(methylsulfonyl)benzoyl)guanidine
- CAS Number: 187870-78-6
- PubChem CID: 9799487
- ChemSpider: 7975252
- UNII: QH6B4V5743
- ChEMBL: ChEMBL2107802
- CompTox Dashboard (EPA): DTXSID30870177

Chemical and physical data
- Formula: C_{11}H_{15}N_{3}O_{5}S_{2}
- Molar mass: 333.38 g·mol^{−1}
- 3D model (JSmol): Interactive image
- SMILES: Cc1cc(c(cc1C(=O)NC(=N)N)S(=O)(=O)C)S(=O)(=O)C
- InChI: InChI=1S/C11H15N3O5S2/c1-6-4-8(20(2,16)17)9(21(3,18)19)5-7(6)10(15)14-11(12)13/h4-5H,1-3H3,(H4,12,13,14,15); Key:GROMEQPXDKRRIE-UHFFFAOYSA-N

Rimeporide is an experimental drug for the treatment of Duchenne muscular dystrophy, being developed by the EspeRare foundation. it has been granted orphan drug status by the European Medicines Agency.

== Mechanism of action ==
The substance blocks an ion pump called sodium–hydrogen antiporter 1. While the exact mechanism is unknown, it is speculated that inhibition of this pump reduces pH, sodium and calcium overload in cells of patients with Duchenne muscular dystrophy.

== History ==
Rimeporide was designed as a treatment for chronic heart failure. It was tested in seven Phase I studies clinical trials in patients with congestive heart failure and some degree of renal insufficiency. Subsequently, the drug was licensed to EspeRare, a Swiss nonprofit organisation that aims at repositioning drugs for rare diseases. As of May 2015, the substance has demonstrated efficacy in several animal models of Duchenne muscular dystrophy.

It has also been recently tested in young boys with Duchenne muscular Dystrophy aged 6 to 11 years.

== See also ==
=== Other drugs for Duchenne muscular dystrophy ===
- Ataluren
- Biostrophin (experimental)
- Idebenone (experimental)
