= F420H2DH family =

Family of transport proteins

Identifiers
- Symbol: F_{420}H_{2}DH
- TCDB: 3.D.9

The H^{+}-translocating F_{420}H_{2} Dehydrogenase (F_{420}H_{2}DH) Family (TC# 3.D.9) is a member of the Na^{+} transporting Mrp superfamily. A single F_{420}H_{2} dehydrogenase (also referred to as F_{420}H_{2}:quinol oxidoreductase) from the methanogenic archaeon, Methanosarcina mazei Gö1, has been shown to be a redox driven proton pump. The F_{420}H_{2}DH of M. mazei has a molecular size of about 120 kDa and contains Fe-S clusters and FAD. A similar five-subunit enzyme has been isolated from Methanolobus tindarius. The sulfate-reducing Archaeoglobus fulgidus (and several other archaea) also have this enzyme.

== Function ==
Reduction of 2-hydroxyphenazine by F_{420}H_{2}DH is accompanied by the translocation of 1 H+ per 2 electrons transferred.

=== Transport Reaction ===
The overall vectorial reaction catalyzed by F_{420}H_{2}DH is

Reduced donor (2e^{−}) + H^{+} (in) ⇌ oxidized acceptor (2e^{−}) + H^{+} (out)

=== Role in Methanogenesis ===
Methanomassiliicoccus luminyensis has been isolated from the human gut and requires H_{2} and methanol or methylamines to produce methane. The organism lacks cytochromes, indicating that it cannot couple membrane-bound electron transfer reactions with the extrusion of protons or sodium ions using other known methanogenic pathways. Furthermore, M. luminyensis contains a soluble MvhAGD/HdrABC complex, as found in obligate hydrogenotrophic methanogens, but the energy conserving methyltransferase (MtrA-H) is absent. Evidence has been presented that M. luminyensis uses two types of heterodisulfide reductases (HdrABC and HdrD) in an energy conserving process. RT-qPCR studies revealed that genes coding for both heterodisulfide reductases were expressed at high levels. Other genes with high transcript abundance were fpoA as part of the operon encoding the 'headless' F_{420}H_{2} dehydrogenase and atpB as part of the operon encoding the A_{1}A_{o} ATP synthase. High activities of the soluble heterodisulfide reductase HdrABC and the hydrogenase MvhADG were found in the cytoplasm. Also, heterologously produced HdrD could reduce CoM-S-S-CoB using reduced methylviologen as electron donor. It is proposed that membrane-bound electron transfer is based on the conversion of two molecules of methanol and the concurrent formation of two molecules of the heterodisulfide CoM-S-S-CoB. First, the HdrABC/MvhADG complex catalyzes the H_{2}-dependent reduction of CoM-S-S-CoB and the formation of reduced ferredoxin. Second, reduced ferredoxin is oxidized by the 'headless' F_{420}H_{2} dehydrogenase, thereby translocating up to 4 H^{+} across the membrane, and electrons are channeled to HdrD for the reduction of the second heterodisulfide.

== Homology ==
The gene cluster encoding the F_{420}H_{2}DH includes 12 genes, fpoABCDHIJKLMNO. Several of the subunits are related to those of the mitochondrial 'complex I' NDH family members (TC# 3.D.1). Thus, the gene products, FpoA, H, J, K, L, M and N, are highly hydrophobic and are homologous to subunits that form the membrane integral module of NDH-1. FpoB, C, D and I have their counterparts in the amphipathic membrane-associated module of NDH-1. However, homologues of the hydrophilic subunits of the NADH-oxidizing complex are absent.

== See also ==
- Transporter Classification Database
