= 4EGI-1 =

Names
- Preferred IUPAC name 2-{[4-(3,4-Dichlorophenyl)-1,3-thiazol-2-yl]hydrazinylidene}-3-(2-nitrophenyl)propanoic acid

Identifiers
CAS Number	315706-13-9
3D model (JSmol)	Interactive image
ChEMBL	ChEMBL254578
ChemSpider	23015198
PubChem CID	6911989
UNII	H57REU3DHP
- InChI: InChI=1S/C18H12Cl2N4O4S/c19-12-6-5-10(7-13(12)20)15-9-29-18(21-15)23-22-14(17(25)26)8-11-3-1-2-4-16(11)24(27)28/h1-7,9H,8H2,(H,21,23)(H,25,26)/b22-14- Key: KFRKRECSIYXARE-HMAPJEAMSA-N
- SMILES: OC(=O)C(\CC1=CC=CC=C1[N+]([O-])=O)=N/NC1=NC(=CS1)C1=CC(Cl)=C(Cl)C=C1

Properties
Chemical formula	C_{18}H_{12}Cl_{2}N_{4}O_{4}S
Molar mass	451.28 g·mol^{−1}
- Except where otherwise noted, data are given for materials in their standard state (at 25 °C [77 °F], 100 kPa). Infobox references

4EGI-1 is an experimental chemical compound that has been shown to stop the growth of certain types of cancer cells in laboratory tests (in vitro).

The compound works by interfering with the complex process cells use to create proteins. In order for a cell to make a protein, it must first "read" the genetic instructions from a molecule called mRNA. This process, known as translation, requires special proteins called initiation factors to get started. 4EGI-1 blocks two of these factors from working together, which halts the production of many proteins. Because cancer cells often grow and divide very rapidly, they are especially dependent on high rates of protein production, making them vulnerable to this type of disruption.

== Reaction mechanism ==
4EGI-1 mimics the action of a class of cellular regulatory molecules that naturally inhibit the binding of two initiation factors necessary for interaction of transcribed mRNA with the subunits of ribosomal complexes. These naturally occurring regulatory molecules, or binding proteins (BPs), bind to eukaryotic initiation factor eIF4E, preventing its association with eIF4G, another initiation factor. These two proteins, under unregulated conditions, form a complex, known as eIF4F, which associates with the 5’ cap of mRNA and the ribosomal subunits. eIF4E BPs (4E-BPs), as small polypeptides, consist of the same amino acid sequence as the portion of eIF4G that interacts with eIF4E. 4EGI-1 thus prevents the proper association of mRNA, carrying the coded message of transcribed genes, with the ribosome, the cellular component necessary for the translation of those genes into functional proteins. Naturally occurring 4E-BPs are regulated by a protein kinase, mTOR, which through phosphorylation deactivates the binding affinity of 4E-BPs for the eIF4E protein.

== Binding site specifics and effects of use ==
4EGI-1, like 4E-BP polypeptides, displaces eIF4G by associating with a binding site on eIF4E. Not only does the synthetic molecule prevent the association between the two initiation factors, but by binding to a different portion of eIF4E via the same motif, it has been shown to actually increase the binding affinity of eIF4E for endogenous (originating within an organism) 4E-BP1.

The Harvard research group leading the study screened 16,000 compounds, looking for one that would displace a fluorescein-labeled peptide derived from the eIF4G sequence that binds to the eIF4E form at the same site. Eventually they turned up 4EGI-1, which displaced eIF4G by binding to a smaller subset of its binding site (on eIF4E). The newly found molecule had the added advantage of enhancing 4E-BP1 binding, a surprise given that this molecule is also believed to bind eIF4E via the same motif. It appears that by displacing the eIF4G sequence without blocking the entire binding interface of eIF4E, 4EGI-1 is able to clear the “docking site” of the endogenous regulator.

== Cap-dependent vs. initiation factor-independent translation ==
One caveat to the function of 4EGI-1 and thus the entire class of 4E-BP regulatory proteins is that both the synthetic and naturally occurring molecules are effective at inhibiting only cap-dependent translation, not initiation factor-independent translation.

Messenger RNAs (mRNAs) are transcribed from DNA, and serve as templates for the synthesis of proteins by ribosomal translation. Weak mRNAs contain long and highly structured untranslatable regions at their 5’ end. This lengthy region makes it difficult for enzymes to determine where transcription should begin. As a result, initiation factor proteins are required for translation of the message into protein. These weak mRNAs, or mRNAs that carry the code for proteins involved in the development of cancer cells, require cap-dependent translation which necessitates the cellular involvement of the eIFs. Examples of weak mRNAs include those that code for proliferation-related, and anti-apoptotic proteins. Strong mRNAs, in contrast, are translated with much less cellular machinery such as eIFs and generally code for biologically necessary proteins, such as those needed for the essential metabolic processes of a cell. Therapies such as the use of 4EGI-1 against cancer cells can thus be created such that their biologic targets include only the initiation factors involved in the production of weak mRNAs.

Cap-dependent translation involves a series of steps that join the small and large ribosomal subunits at the start codon of mRNA. The initiation factor complex eIF4F is dependent upon the presence of a 5’ mRNA cap upstream from the start codon in order to initiate translation.

Initiation factor independent translation does not require the association of initiation factors with the 5’ cap of mRNA. As an alternative, the associated ribosomal units are moved to the start location by internal ribosome entry site trans acting factors (ITAFs). It has been found that several cellular proteins that respond to apoptotic signals are translated in this fashion.

== Techniques of discovery ==
When attempting to identify biological molecules that would disrupt the formation of the F complex, researchers developed a high-throughput fluorescence polarization (FP)-binding assay. In this assay, a small peptide of a known sequence was synthesized and tagged with a fluorescent molecule. This traceable peptide of sequence KYTYDELFQLK binds to the binding site of endogenous 4E-BPs on eIF4E. 16,000 compounds of known chemical composition were then tested in this assay. Compounds that displace the labeled peptide from eIF4E would yield a decrease in fluorescence polarization. The sequence of 4EGI-1 was such that it displaced the labeled peptide, thus demonstrating its affinity for the complex binding site on eIF4E.

== See also ==
- Rotavirus translation
- NSP3 (rotavirus)
