= NhaB family =

The NhaB family (TC# 2.A.34) belongs to the ion transporter (IT) superfamily. A representative list of proteins belonging to the NhaB family can be found in the Transporter Classification Database.

NhaB homologues are usually about 500 aminoacyl residues (aas) in length and possess about 12 transmembrane alpha-helical spanners (TMSs), although some members differ in their number of TMSs. NhaB homologues also exhibit a region with limited sequence similarity to a 46 kDa membrane protein of unknown function from Mycobacterium leprae (spP46838) which is also homologous to a member of arsenate resistance pumps of bacteria, archaea and eukaryotes (TC# 3.A.4). Only gram-negative bacterial proteins have been functionally characterized.

The E. coli NhaB is 58% identical to the orthologous Vibrio alginolyticus Na^{+}/H^{+} antiporter. Although the latter protein is predicted to exhibit 10 TMSs, construction of NhaB-phoA fusions led to evidence for a 9 TMS model with the N-terminus in the cytoplasm and the C-terminus in the periplasm. A centrally located aspartyl residue in the 3rd TMS is conserved in all members of the family and important for activity.

The generalized transport reaction catalyzed by NhaB of E. coli is:

2 Na^{+} (in) + 3 H^{+} (out) ⇌ 2 Na^{+} (out) + 3 H^{+} (in).

== See also ==
- Sodium–hydrogen antiporter
- Antiporter
- Transporter Classification Database
