= Growth hormone-binding protein =

Protein fragment in Homo sapiens

growth hormone receptor

Identifiers
- Symbol: GHR
- NCBI gene: 2690
- HGNC: 4263
- OMIM: 600946
- RefSeq: NM_000163
- UniProt: P10912

Other data
- Locus: Chr. 5 p13-p12
Search for
- Structures: Swiss-model
- Domains: InterPro

Growth hormone-binding protein (GHBP) is a soluble carrier protein for growth hormone (GH). The full range of functions of GHBP remains to be determined. However, current research suggests that the protein is associated with regulation of the GH availability and half-life in the circulatory system, as well as modulating GH receptor function.

== Expression ==
In humans, GHBP is formed by post-translational modification after the complete transcription and translation of the growth hormone receptor (GHR) gene into the cell-surface receptor protein. The gene that codes for GHR (and inherently GHBP) is on Chromosome 5. A precursor messenger RNA (mRNA) from the complete gene first is transcribed and then spliced to encode the full receptor protein. This mature mRNA is composed of exons. Exons are peptide encoding regions of DNA genes that remain in the transcript after splicing and during the maturation of mRNA. The mRNA transcript encodes for a receptor protein that is made up of three distinct parts: an intracellular domain, a transmembrane domain, and an extracellular domain. Specifically, part of exon 2 and exons 3-7 of the GHR gene will translate to amino acids that make up the extracellular domain of GHR. This extracellular domain physically binds GH in the receptor-ligand interaction.

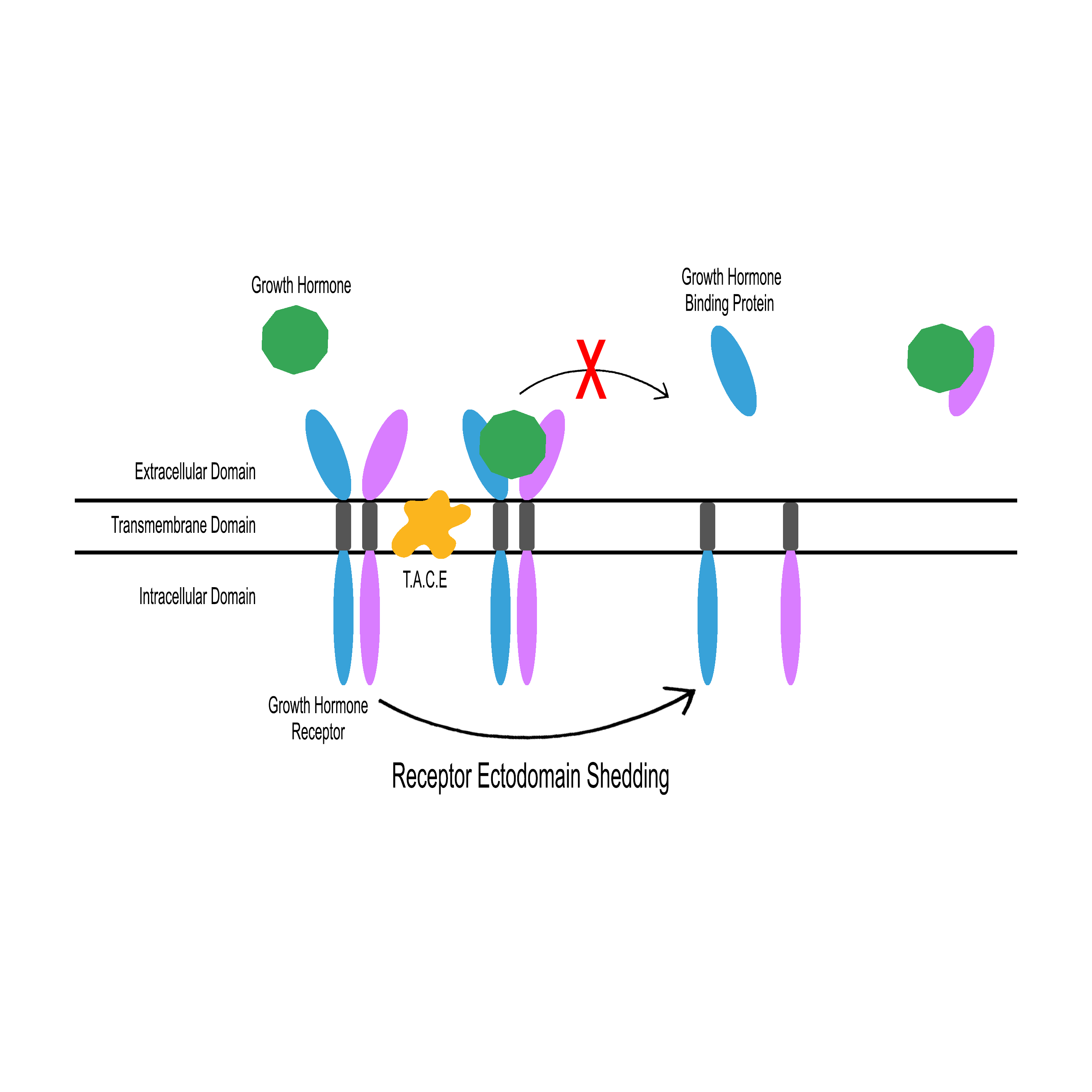
"Receptor Ectodomain Shedding" - Tumor-necrosis factor alpha converting enzyme (T.A.C.E.) proteolytically cleaves the extracellular domain off of (two) growth hormone receptor(s) to release the soluble carrier-protein growth hormone-binding protein. Adapted from Fisker.

In rodents and in humans the concentration GHR mRNA and the concentration of GHBP in the maternal circulation are dramatically increased during pregnancy. This is considered likely to control the availability of GH for binding to GH receptors in the maternal tissues during pregnancy.

=== Receptor ectodomain shedding ===
When the extracellular domain of GHR is proteolytically cleaved (see: proteolytic cleavage) from the rest of the receptor protein, the extracellular domain is released as the water-soluble, carrier protein GHBP. As the extracellular domain alone, the polypeptide consists of 246 amino acids and is roughly 60 kDA in size. This cleaving process is called “receptor ectodomain shedding. In humans and rabbits, tumor-necrosis factor alpha converting enzyme (T.A.C.E.) is postulated to play a significant role in the post-translational processing activity that sheds GHBP from GHR. Studies show that this activity primarily occurs in the liver. When growth hormone is bound to two dimerized GH receptors, the shedding activity is inhibited. This occurs because when the ligand binds to the receptors, a conformational change occurs in them that potentially blocks the proteolytic activity of T.A.C.E.

=== Alternative splicing ===
In humans, studies have shown that alternative splicing of the GHR gene can lead to increased rates of proteolysis. For example, a deletion within the mRNA that encodes part of the transmembrane domain of the protein effectively leads to non-translation of the intracellular domain due to the presence of a stop codon. This truncated version of GHR is cleaved more frequently into GHBP and may potentially explain the reasoning behind increased concentrations of GHBP present in some tissues.

In mouse and rat models, the extracellular domain is formed primarily through alternative splicing of the precursor GHR mRNA to form a mature transcript that translate GHBP alone. These animals can potentially shed GHBP via post-translational modification as well, although this activity is minimal.

== Function ==
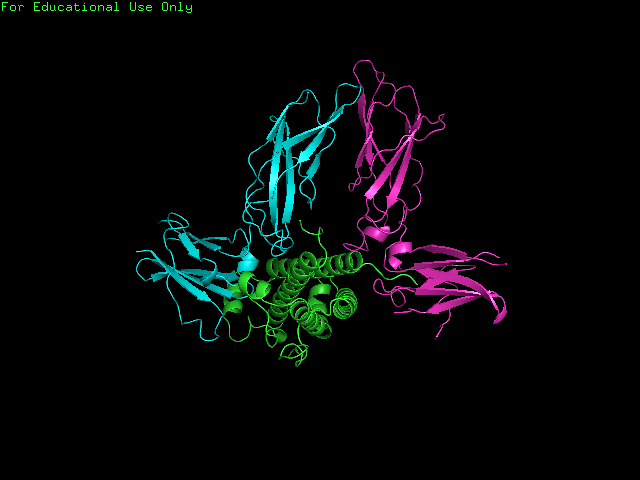
Two growth hormone-binding proteins (blue, pink) in a two-to-one ratio with growth hormone (green). Source: PDB 1HWG

The full range of physiological consequences of GHBP binding GH is not known , however literature provides evidence that the carrier-protein prolongs the half-life of growth hormone through its binding with the ligand.

=== Binding stoichiometry ===
Growth hormone binds to GHBP and GHR via an interactive region of helices 1 and 4 of GH. Two receptor molecules are pre-dimerized upon GH binding, so it always binds in a 1:2 ratio. Assays estimate that growth hormone and growth hormone binding protein form a natural complex at a 1:1 ratio for transport and preservation of the ligand through the bloodstream. However, some sources have shown that high physiological concentration of GHBP will result in a 1:2 ratio. When the cysteine amino acids in GHBP are mutated and the disulfide bridges are disrupted, the ability of the ligand to bind to the active site of the GHBP is significantly lessened.

=== Activation ===
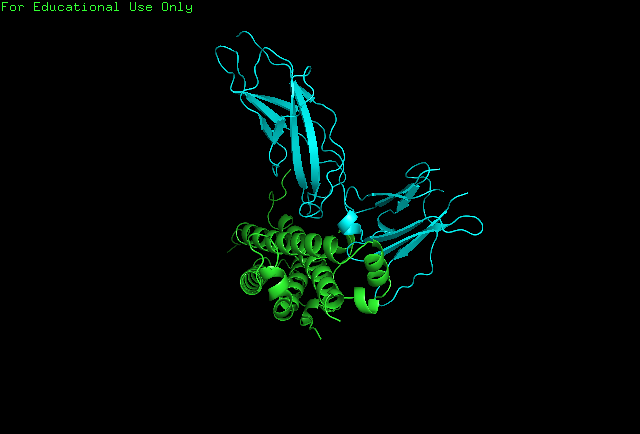
Growth-hormone binding protein (blue) in a one-to-one ratio with modified growth hormone (green). Source: PDB 1HWH

The clearance rate, or the rate at which the carrier protein is broken down, for GHBP alone is much faster than when it is bound to its ligand. Additionally, current literature provides evidence that the carrier-protein prolongs the half-life of growth hormone through its binding with the ligand. One purpose of GHBP can be inferred: to maintain the level of GH in the blood, as roughly half of its concentration is complexed with GHBP. Yet this could be confounded by the fact that GH binding to GHBP prevents the ligand from binding to GHR and ultimately proteolytic activity. Another function is that GHBP displays competitive inhibition for GH against the GHR receptor.

Studies elucidate another aspect of GHBP physiological role: The proteolytic cleavage activity that forms GHBP ultimately regulates GHR production in humans as well as rats. If there is low GHBP concentration then there are high levels of GHR expression. Conversely, high levels of GHBP protein show negative correlation with levels of growth hormone receptor expression.

== Isoforms ==
=== Exon 3 ===
Studies have identified a GHBP isoform that exists due to gene polymorphism, or variable expression of the allele. These isoforms differ based on whether or not the extracellular domain of GHR includes the amino acids encoded by exon 3 - exon 3 is either kept (dominant) or spliced out (recessive). As human are diploid, they may genotype as homozygous dominant (two copies of the allele retain exon 3), heterozygous (one copy with Exon 3, and one without), or homozygous recessive (two copies of the allele without exon 3). Studies have shown that the two isoforms can co-exist as dimerized GH receptors, as E3+/E3+, E3+/E3-, or E3-/E3-.

Furthermore, the two isoforms both exist in the blood as GHBP. However, they may have separate functions that are poorly understood. The presence or absence of exon 3 in humans is individual-specific, but one study suggests that gender may play a role in this variable splicing, as females were shown to express higher levels of deleted-exon 3 GHBP in their blood. The evolutionary reason for exon-3 variable GHBP expression has not clearly been defined, and the isoforms in the blood have not been shown to differ with respect to GH affinity, which is unusual for an isoform that is missing an entire exon.
