= Cysteate synthase =

Identifiers
- EC no.: 2.5.1.76

Databases
- IntEnz: IntEnz view
- BRENDA: BRENDA entry
- ExPASy: NiceZyme view
- KEGG: KEGG entry
- MetaCyc: metabolic pathway
- PRIAM: profile
- PDB structures: RCSB PDB PDBe PDBsum
Search
- PMC: articles
- PubMed: articles
- NCBI: proteins

Cysteate synthase (EC 2.5.1.76) is an enzyme characterised from Methanosarcinales with systematic name sulfite:O-phospho-L-serine sulfotransferase (phosphate-hydrolysing, L-cysteate-forming). It catalyses the following chemical reaction which produces L-cysteic acid by reacting phosphoserine with sulfite (H_{2}SO_{3}), giving orthophosphate (P_{i}) as a byproduct:

phosphoserine
+ H_{2}SO_{3}
P_{i}
L-cysteic acid

This enzyme is a transferase containing pyridoxal-phosphate as a cofactor.
