= Folate transporter 1 =

Mammalian protein found in Homo sapiens

SLC19A1

Identifiers
- Aliases: SLC19A1, CHMD, FOLT, IFC1, REFC, RFC1, solute carrier family 19 member 1, IFC-1, RFC, hRFC, RFT-1, hMEGAF
- External IDs: OMIM: 600424; MGI: 103182; GeneCards: SLC19A1

Gene location (Human)
Chr.	Chromosome 21 (human)
Band	21q22.3	Start	45,493,572 bp
Band	21q22.3	End	45,573,365 bp

Gene location (Mouse)
Chr.	Chromosome 10 (mouse)
Band	10 C1|10 39.72 cM	Start	77,032,241 bp
Band	10 C1|10 39.72 cM	End	77,061,002 bp
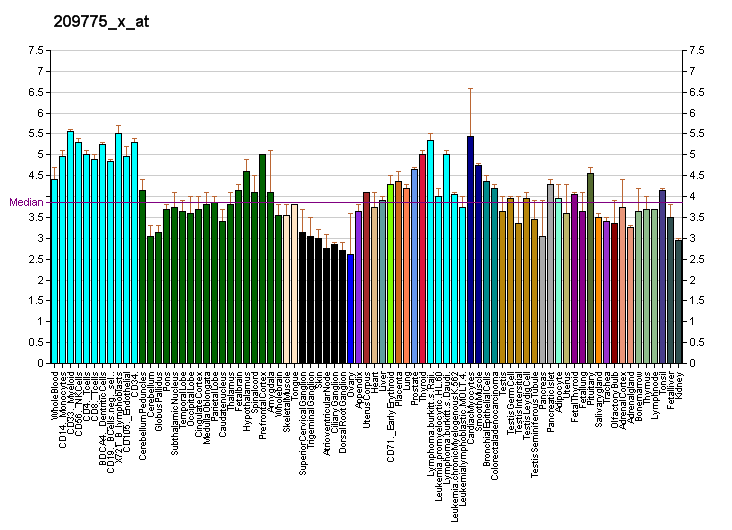

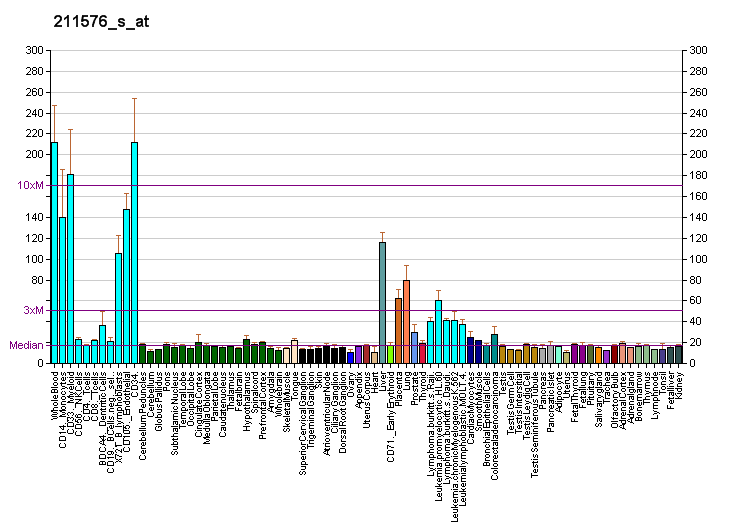

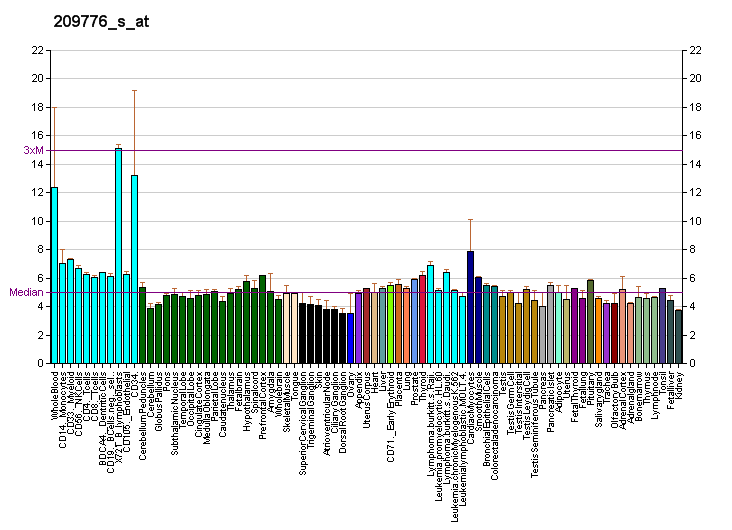
RNA expression pattern
Bgee	Human / Mouse (ortholog); Top expressed in: jejunal mucosa; blood; endothelial cell; Epithelium of choroid plexus; retinal pigment epithelium; duodenum; gallbladder; stromal cell of endometrium; right lung; putamen / Top expressed in: Paneth cell; right kidney; retinal pigment epithelium; vestibular membrane of cochlear duct; choroid plexus of fourth ventricle; ciliary body; Epithelium of choroid plexus; human kidney; crypt of lieberkuhn of small intestine; endothelial cell of lymphatic vessel; More reference expression data
BioGPS	More reference expression data
Gene ontology
Molecular function	folic acid binding; methotrexate transmembrane transporter activity; vitamin transmembrane transporter activity; folic acid transmembrane transporter activity; folate:anion antiporter activity
Cellular component	integral component of membrane; integral component of plasma membrane; apical plasma membrane; membrane; basolateral plasma membrane; plasma membrane
Biological process	folic acid metabolic process; folate transmembrane transport; folic acid transport; methotrexate transport; vitamin transport; folate import across plasma membrane; transmembrane transport; vitamin transmembrane transport
Sources:Amigo / QuickGO
Orthologs
Databases	NCBI: entry; OMA: entry
Species	Human	Mouse
Entrez	6573	20509
Ensembl	ENSG00000173638	ENSMUSG00000001436
UniProt	P41440	P41438
RefSeq (mRNA)	NM_001205206; NM_001205207; NM_003056; NM_194255; NM_001352510 NM_001352511; NM_001352512	NM_001199271; NM_031196
RefSeq (protein)	NP_001192135; NP_001192136; NP_919231; NP_001339439; NP_001339440 NP_001339441	NP_001186200; NP_112473
Location (UCSC)	Chr 21: 45.49 – 45.57 Mb	Chr 10: 77.03 – 77.06 Mb
PubMed search
- Wikidata
View/Edit Human	View/Edit Mouse

Folate transporter 1 is a protein which in humans is encoded by the SLC19A1 gene.

== Function ==
Transport of folate compounds into mammalian cells can occur via receptor-mediated (see folate receptor 1) or carrier-mediated mechanisms. A functional coordination between these 2 mechanisms has been proposed to be the method of folate uptake in certain cell types. Methotrexate (MTX) is an antifolate chemotherapeutic agent that is actively transported by the carrier-mediated uptake system. RFC1 plays a role in maintaining intracellular concentrations of folate. SLC19A1 has also been shown to transport the immune second messenger 2'3'-cGAMP.

== Clinical significance ==
Individuals carrying a specific polymorphism of SLC19A1 (c.80GG) have lower levels of folate. Other studies have also shown that individuals carrying the c.80AA polymorphism who are treated with methotrexate have higher levels of this anti-folate chemotherapeutic agent. Personalized dosing of the drug depending on the patient's genotype may therefore be required.

== Alternative names ==
- Reduced folate carrier 1
- Intestinal folate carrier 1

== See also ==
- Solute carrier family
- Folate-binding protein
- Reduced folate carrier family
