= Sodium/hydrogen exchanger 6 =

Protein-coding gene in the species Homo sapiens

SLC9A6

Identifiers
- Aliases: SLC9A6, MRSA, NHE6, solute carrier family 9 member A6, MRXSCH
- External IDs: OMIM: 300231; MGI: 2443511; GeneCards: SLC9A6

Gene location (Human)
Chr.	X chromosome (human)
Band	Xq26.3	Start	135,973,841 bp
Band	Xq26.3	End	136,047,269 bp

Gene location (Mouse)
Chr.	X chromosome (mouse)
Band	X|X A5- A6	Start	55,655,117 bp
Band	X|X A5- A6	End	55,709,590 bp
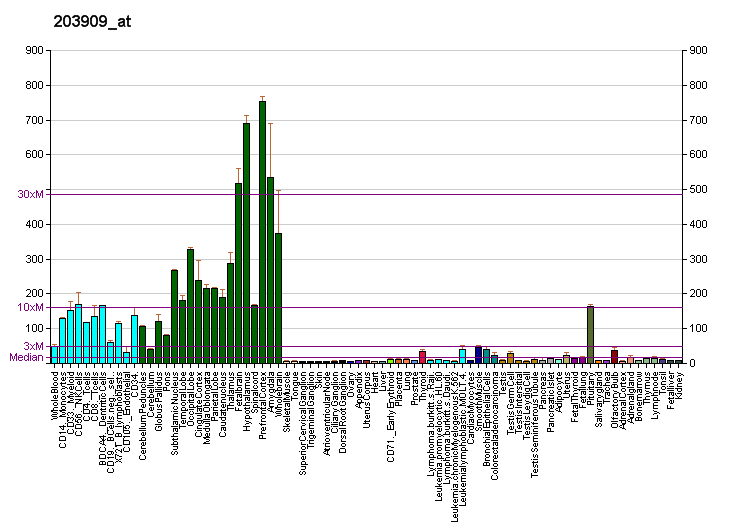
RNA expression pattern
Bgee	Human / Mouse (ortholog); Top expressed in: lateral nuclear group of thalamus; middle temporal gyrus; pons; pars compacta; postcentral gyrus; superior vestibular nucleus; orbitofrontal cortex; pars reticulata; superior frontal gyrus; entorhinal cortex / Top expressed in: superior cervical ganglion; Region I of hippocampus proper; dorsomedial hypothalamic nucleus; substantia nigra; ventral tegmental area; otolith organ; central gray substance of midbrain; utricle; ciliary body; ventromedial nucleus; More reference expression data
BioGPS	More reference expression data
Gene ontology
Molecular function	solute:proton antiporter activity; antiporter activity; potassium:proton antiporter activity; sodium:proton antiporter activity
Cellular component	axon terminus; integral component of membrane; recycling endosome; endosome; late endosome; early endosome membrane; endoplasmic reticulum membrane; intracellular membrane-bounded organelle; membrane; axonal spine; plasma membrane; synapse; recycling endosome membrane; dendrite; early endosome; mitochondrion; endosome membrane; cytoplasmic vesicle
Biological process	neuron projection morphogenesis; dendrite extension; sodium ion transport; proton transmembrane transport; synapse organization; cation transport; ion transport; brain-derived neurotrophic factor receptor signaling pathway; dendritic spine development; regulation of neurotrophin TRK receptor signaling pathway; axon extension; regulation of pH; potassium ion transmembrane transport; transmembrane transport; regulation of intracellular pH; sodium ion import across plasma membrane; anion transmembrane transport; sodium ion transmembrane transport
Sources:Amigo / QuickGO
Orthologs
Databases	NCBI: entry; OMA: entry
Species	Human	Mouse
Entrez	10479	236794
Ensembl	ENSG00000198689	ENSMUSG00000060681
UniProt	Q92581	n/a
RefSeq (mRNA)	NM_001042537; NM_001177651; NM_006359; NM_001330652; NM_001379110 NM_001400909; NM_001400910; NM_001400911; NM_001400912; NM_001400913	NM_172780; NM_001358861
RefSeq (protein)	NP_001036002; NP_001171122; NP_001317581; NP_006350; NP_001366039	n/a
Location (UCSC)	Chr X: 135.97 – 136.05 Mb	Chr X: 55.66 – 55.71 Mb
PubMed search
- Wikidata
View/Edit Human	View/Edit Mouse

Sodium/hydrogen exchanger 6 is an integral membrane protein that in humans is encoded by the SLC9A6 gene. It was originally thought to be a mitochondrial-targeted protein, but subsequent studies have localized it to the plasma membrane and recycling endosomes.

Loss of function causes Christianson syndrome.

== See also ==
- SLC9A6+protein,+human at the U.S. National Library of Medicine Medical Subject Headings (MeSH)
