= Christianson syndrome =

- Specialty: Medical genetics
- Causes: Mutation in SLC9A6 gene

Christianson syndrome is an X linked syndrome associated with intellectual disability, microcephaly, seizures, ataxia and absent speech.

== Presentation ==
Onset of symptoms is normally within the first year of life with truncal ataxia and seizures. The head is small (microcephaly). Common facial abnormalities include:

- Long narrow face
- Prominent nose
- Prominent jaw
- Open mouth

Other common features include:

- Uncontrolled drooling
- Abnormal eye movements

The associated intellectual disability is usually in the profound range, with an IQ below 40 commonly presenting.

Those affected often have a happy demeanor with frequent smiling and spontaneous laughter.

== Genetics ==
This condition is caused by mutations in the SLC9A6 gene. This gene is located on the long arm of the X chromosome (Xq26.3). The gene encodes a sodium/hydrogen exchanger located in the endosomes. Mutations in this gene cause a decrease in the pH (overacidification) of the endosomes.

How this causes the clinical features is not known presently. The inheritance of this condition is X-linked dominant.

== Diagnosis ==
The diagnosis may be suspected on clinical grounds. It is made by sequencing the SLC9A6 gene.

=== Differential diagnosis ===
- Angelman syndrome
- Spinocerebellar ataxia type 29

== Management ==
There is presently no curative treatment. Management is supportive.

== Epidemiology ==
The prevalence is estimated to be around 1 in 16,000 to 1 in 100,000, worldwide, making it a rare disease.

== History ==
This condition was first described in 1999. The causative mutation was discovered in 2008.
