= Syntaxin binding protein 3 =

Protein found in humans

STXBP3
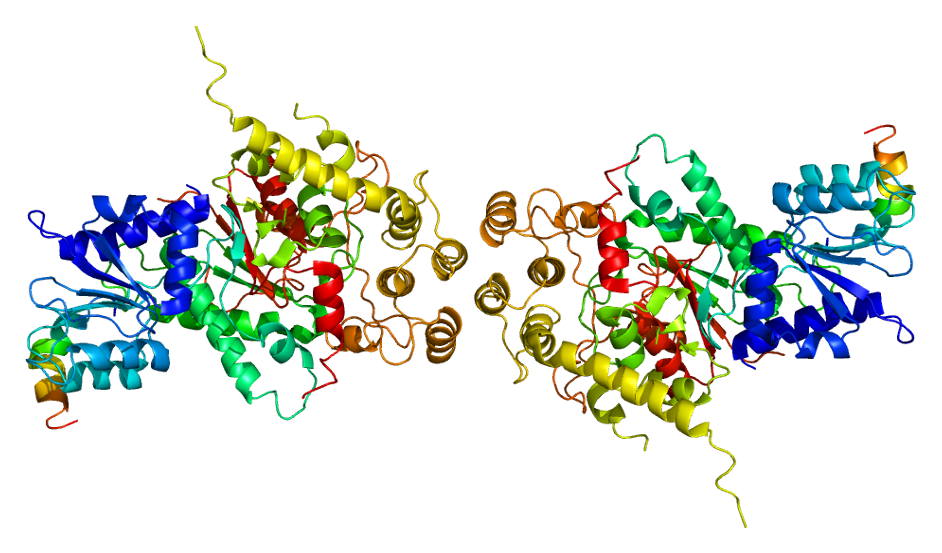

Identifiers
- Aliases: STXBP3, MUNC18-3, MUNC18C, PSP, UNC-18C, Syntaxin binding protein 3
- External IDs: OMIM: 608339; MGI: 107362; GeneCards: STXBP3

Gene location (Human)
Chr.	Chromosome 1 (human)
Band	1p13.3	Start	108,746,674 bp
Band	1p13.3	End	108,809,523 bp

Gene location (Mouse)
Chr.	Chromosome 3 (mouse)
Band	3|3 F3	Start	108,700,492 bp
Band	3|3 F3	End	108,747,842 bp
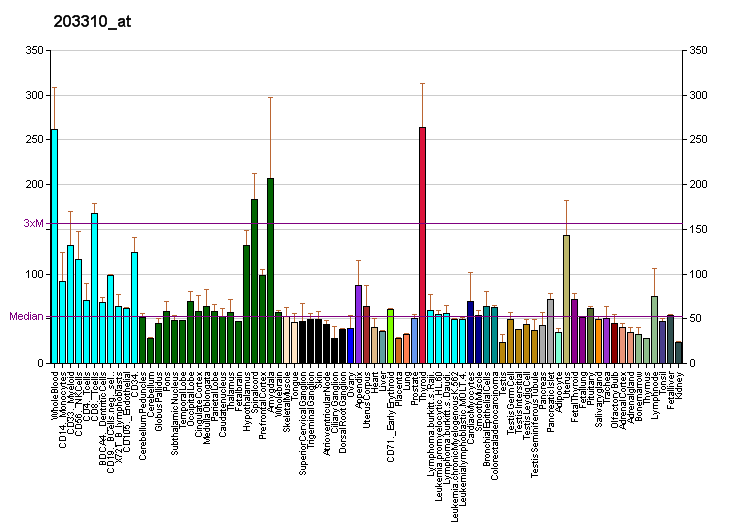
RNA expression pattern
Bgee	Human / Mouse (ortholog); Top expressed in: corpus callosum; Achilles tendon; tibia; C1 segment; germinal epithelium; epithelium of nasopharynx; inferior ganglion of vagus nerve; monocyte; sural nerve; palpebral conjunctiva / Top expressed in: skin of external ear; stroma of bone marrow; Epithelium of choroid plexus; ascending aorta; sciatic nerve; jejunum; aortic valve; retinal pigment epithelium; transitional epithelium of urinary bladder; lumbar subsegment of spinal cord; More reference expression data
BioGPS	More reference expression data
Gene ontology
Molecular function	syntaxin-1 binding; protein binding; syntaxin binding
Cellular component	cytoplasm; platelet alpha granule; cytosol; membrane; tertiary granule; plasma membrane; basolateral plasma membrane; specific granule; apical plasma membrane; extracellular exosome; phagocytic vesicle; presynapse
Biological process	protein to membrane docking; protein heterooligomerization; neutrophil degranulation; insulin secretion; vesicle docking involved in exocytosis; response to insulin; brain development; negative regulation of calcium ion-dependent exocytosis; protein transport; platelet aggregation; vesicle-mediated transport; exocytosis; transport; cellular glucose homeostasis; negative regulation of glucose import; cellular response to interferon-gamma
Sources:Amigo / QuickGO
Orthologs
Databases	NCBI: entry; OMA: entry
Species	Human	Mouse
Entrez	6814	20912
Ensembl	ENSG00000116266	ENSMUSG00000027882
UniProt	O00186	Q60770
RefSeq (mRNA)	NM_007269	NM_011504
RefSeq (protein)	NP_009200	NP_035634
Location (UCSC)	Chr 1: 108.75 – 108.81 Mb	Chr 3: 108.7 – 108.75 Mb
PubMed search
- Wikidata
View/Edit Human	View/Edit Mouse

Syntaxin-binding protein 3 is a protein that in humans is encoded by the STXBP3 gene.

== Interactions ==
Syntaxin binding protein 3 has been shown to interact with STX2 and STX4.
