= Tubular proteinuria =

Tubular proteinuria is proteinuria (excessive protein in the urine) caused by renal tubular dysfunction. Tubular proteinuria is a laboratory sign, not a disease; as a sign it appears in various syndromes and diseases, such as Fanconi syndrome.

Proteins of low molecular weight are normally filtered at the glomerulus of the kidney and are then normally reabsorbed by the tubular cells, so that less than 150 mg per day should appear in the urine. Low-molecular-weight proteins' appearing in larger quantities than normal is tubular proteinuria, which points to failure of reabsorption by damaged tubular cells.

Tubular proteinuria is sometimes missed if only the albumin-to-creatinine ratio is tested.
