= Monovalent cation:proton antiporter-1 =

Family of proteins

Sodium/hydrogen exchanger family
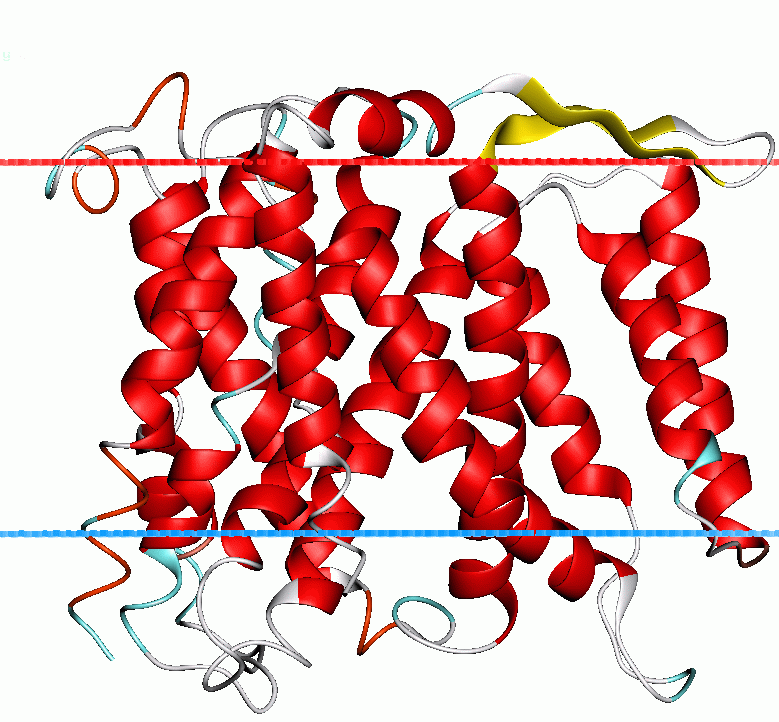

Identifiers
- Symbol: Na_H_Exchanger
- Pfam: PF00999
- TCDB: 2.A.36
- OPM superfamily: 106
- OPM protein: 4bwz
Available protein structures:
- Pfam: structures / ECOD
- PDB: RCSB PDB; PDBe; PDBj
- PDBsum: structure summary

The Monovalent Cation:Proton Antiporter-1 (CPA1) Family (TC# 2.A.36) is a large family of proteins derived from Gram-positive and Gram-negative bacteria, blue-green bacteria, archaea, yeast, plants and animals. The CPA1 family belongs to the VIC superfamily. Transporters from eukaryotes have been functionally characterized to catalyze Na^{+}:H^{+} exchange. Their primary physiological functions are thought to be in (1) cytoplasmic pH regulation, extruding the H^{+} generated during metabolism, and (2) salt tolerance (in plants), due to Na^{+} uptake into vacuoles. Bacterial homologues have also been found to facilitate Na^{+}:H^{+} antiport, but some also catalyze Li^{+}:H^{+} antiport or Ca^{2+}:H^{+} antiport under certain conditions.

== Phylogeny ==
The phylogenetic tree for the CPA1 family shows three principal clusters. The first cluster includes proteins derived exclusively from animals, and all of the functionally characterized members of the family belong to this cluster. Of the two remaining clusters, one includes all bacterial homologues while the other includes one from Arabidopsis thaliana, one from Homo sapiens and two from yeast (S. cerevisiae and S. pombe). Several organisms possess multiple paralogues; for example, seven paralogues are found in C. elegans, and five are known in humans. Most of these paralogues are very similar in sequence, and they belong to the animal-specific cluster.

A representative list of proteins belonging to the CPA1 family can be found in the Transporter Classification Database.

== Structure ==
Numerous members of the CPA1 family have been sequenced, and these proteins vary substantially in size. The bacterial proteins have 520-550 amino acyl residues (aas) while eukaryotic proteins are generally larger, varying in size from 540-900 residues. They exhibit 10-12 putative transmembrane α-helical spanners (TMSs). A proposed topological model suggests that in addition to 12 TMSs, a region between TMSs 9 and 10 dips into the membrane to line the pore. However, one homologue, Nhx1 of S. cerevisiae (TC# 2.A.36.1.12), has an extracellular glycosylated C-terminus.

== Function ==
Using the mammalian NHE1 (TC# 2.A.36.1.1), it has been found that TMSs 4 and 9 as well as the extracellular loop between TMSs 3 and 4 are important for drug (amiloride- and benzoyl guanidinium-based derivatives) sensitivities. Mutations in these regions also affect transport activities. M4 and M9 therefore contain critical sites for both drug and cation recognition.

=== Transport Reaction ===
The generalized transport reaction catalyzed by functionally characterized members of the CPA1 family is:

Na^{+} (out) + H^{+} (in) ⇌ Na^{+} (in) + H^{+} (out).

== See also ==
- Sodium-proton antiporter
- Monovalent cation:Proton antiporter-2
- Monovalent cation:Proton antiporter-3
- Transporter Classification Database
