= Folate-binding protein =

Class of proteins

Folate-binding protein (FBP) are proteins that bind folate, typically the folate receptors and reduced folate carrier.

FBP can be a marker for ovarian cancer.

FBP can be measured to help in tumour classification to aid treatment, as it is over-expressed (20-80 fold) in more than 90% of ovarian and endometrial cancers, as well as 20-50% of breast, lung, colorectal, and renal cell carcinomas. FBP has very limited tissue distribution and expression in non-malignant tissue, making it a good immunotherapy target.

== Alternative usage ==
FBP can refer to protein(s) (e.g. extracted from cow's milk) used to do folic acid assays.
