= Reduced folate carrier family =

Family of transport proteins

The Reduced Folate Carrier (RFC) Family (TC# 2.A.48) is a group of transport proteins that is part of the major facilitator superfamily. RFCs take up folate, reduced folate, derivatives of reduced folate and the drug, methotrexate.

== Structure and Homology ==
These proteins are usually 500-600 amino acyl residues long and possess 12 putative transmembrane α-helical segments (TMSs). Residues in the first TMS and in the region between TMSs 1 and 2, and in TMS 11 appear to play roles in substrate recognition. The large cytoplasmic loop between TMSs 6 and 7 is required for stability and efficient transport.

Proteins of the RFC family have been characterized only from animals, but homologues can also be found in other eukaryotes such as slime molds and Giardia. They have been sequenced from several mammals and from the worm, Caenorhabditis elegans, as well as the fly, Drosophila melanogaster. Humans have at least two RFC family paralogues, and C. elegans has three. All homologues exhibit a high degree of sequence similarity with each other.

== Proposed Mechanisms ==
The RFC members appear to transport reduced folate by an energy-dependent, pH-dependent, Na^{+}-independent mechanism. Folate:H^{+} symport, folate:OH^{−}antiport and folate:anion antiport mechanisms have been proposed. Intracellular anions are able to promote folate derivative uptake. A bidirectional anion antiport mechanism for RFC family members is favored. In support of this notion, RFC1 has been shown to catalyze efflux of thiamin pyrophosphate (TPP).

== Transport Reactions ==
The generalized transport reactions catalyzed by the proteins of the RFC family are:

Folate derivative (out) + anion (in) ⇌ folate derivative (in) + anion (out)
Thiamine (out) + H^{+} (out) ⇌ thiamine (in) + H^{+} (in)
TPP (in) + H^{+} (in) ⇌ TPP (out) + H^{+} (out)

== Medical relevance ==
Several human RFCs have been linked to chronic kidney disease. In particular, RFC1, ThTr-1, and ThTr-2 have been shown to be downregulated in heart, liver and brain, causing malabsorption.

== See also ==
- Reduced folate carrier 1
