= Carboxyl transferase domain =

Carboxyl_trans
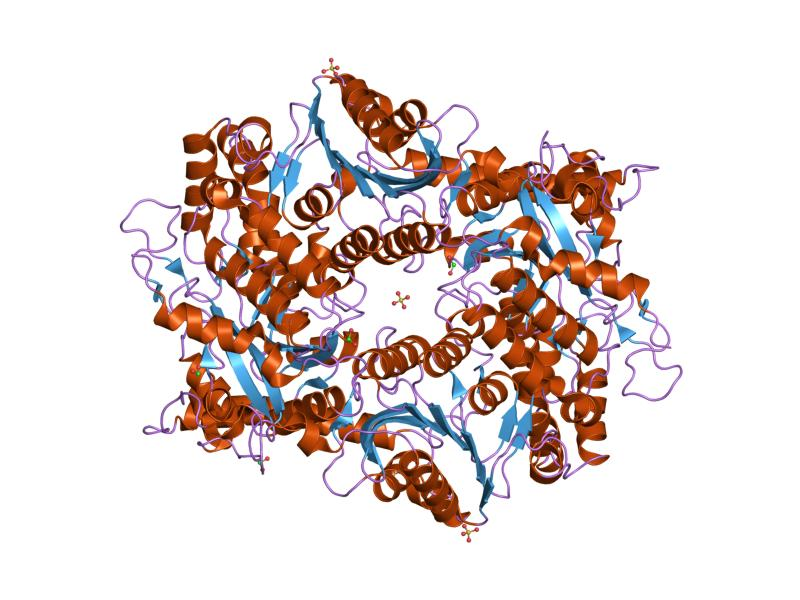
- crystal structure of the carboxyltransferase subunit of the bacterial ion pump glutaconyl-coenzyme a decarboxylase

Identifiers
- Symbol: Carboxyl_trans
- Pfam: PF01039
- Pfam clan: CL0127
- InterPro: IPR000022
- SCOP2: 1od2 / SCOPe / SUPFAM
- TCDB: 3.B.1
Available protein structures:
- PDB: IPR000022 PF01039 (ECOD; PDBsum)
- AlphaFold: IPR000022; PF01039

In molecular biology, proteins containing the carboxyl transferase domain include biotin-dependent carboxylases. This domain carries out the following reaction: transcarboxylation from biotin to an acceptor molecule. There are two recognised types of carboxyl transferase. One of them uses acyl-CoA and the other uses 2-oxo acid as the acceptor molecule of carbon dioxide. All of the members in this family use acyl-CoA as the acceptor molecule.
