= Biotin-independent malonate decarboxylase =

Class of enzymes

Identifiers
- EC no.: 4.1.1.88

Databases
- BRENDA: enzyme data
- ExPASy: NiceZyme view
- KEGG: enzyme entry
- MetaCyc: metabolic pathway
- Rhea: reactions
- PDB structures: RCSB PDB PDBe PDBsum
Search
- PMC: articles
- PubMed: articles
- NCBI: proteins

Biotin-independent malonate decarboxylase (EC 4.1.1.88, malonate decarboxylase (without biotin), malonate decarboxylase, MDC) is an enzyme with systematic name malonate carboxy-lyase (biotin-independent). This enzyme catalyses the following chemical reaction

malonic acid
CO_{2}
acetic acid

Two types of malonate decarboxylase are currently known, both of which form multienzyme complexes.
