= Monovalent cation:proton antiporter-2 =

Family of transport proteins

The Monovalent Cation:Proton Antiporter-2 (CPA2) Family (TC# 2.A.37) is a moderately large family of transporters belonging to the CPA superfamily. Members of the CPA2 family have been found in bacteria, archaea and eukaryotes. The proteins of the CPA2 family consist of between 333 and 900 amino acyl residues and exhibit 10-14 transmembrane α-helical spanners (TMSs).

== Homology ==
Several organisms possess multiple CPA2 paralogues. Thus, E. coli has three, Methanococcus jannaschii has four and Synechocystis sp. has five paralogues. The potassium efflux system, Kef, protects bacteria against the detrimental effects of electrophilic compounds via acidification of the cytoplasm. Kef is inhibited by glutathione (GSH) but activated by glutathione-S-conjugates (GS-X) formed in the presence of electrophiles. GSH and GS-X bind to overlapping sites on Kef, which are located in a cytosolic regulatory domain.

== Function ==
Among the functionally well-characterized members of the family are:

1. KefB/KefC K^{+} efflux proteins of E. coli (i.e., TC# 2.A.37.1.3 and TC# 2.A.37.1.1, respectively), which may be capable of catalyzing both K^{+}/H^{+} antiport and K^{+} uniport, depending on conditions
2. Na^{+}/H^{+} antiporter of Enterococcus hirae (i.e., NapA, TC# 2.A.37.2.1)
3. K^{+}/H^{+} antiporter of S. cerevisiae (i.e., Kha1, TC# 2.A.37.4.1). It has been proposed that under normal physiological conditions, these proteins may function by essentially the same mechanism.

KefC and KefB of E. coli are responsible for glutathione-gated K^{+} efflux. Each of these proteins consists of a transmembrane hydrophobic N-terminal domain, and a lesser conserved C-terminal hydrophilic domain. Each protein interacts with a second protein encoded by genes that overlap the gene encoding the primary transporter. The KefC ancillary protein is YabF while the KefB ancillary protein is YheR. These ancillary proteins stimulate transport activity about 10-fold. These proteins are important for cell survival during exposure to toxic metabolites, possibly because they can release K^{+}, allowing H^{+} uptake. Activation of the KefB or KefC K^{+} efflux system only occurs in the presence of glutathione and a reactive electrophile such as methylglyoxal or N-ethylmaleimide. Formation of the methylglyoxal-glutathione conjugate, S-lactoylglutathione, is catalyzed by glyoxalase I, and S-lactoylglutathione activates KefB and KefC. H^{+} uptake (acidification of the cytoplasm) accompanying or following K^{+} efflux may serve as a further protective mechanism against electrophile toxicity. Inhibition of transport by glutathione was enhanced by NADH.

Gram-negative bacteria are protected against toxic electrophilic compounds by glutathione-gated potassium efflux systems (Kef) that modulate cytoplasmic pH. Roosild et al. (2010) have elucidated the mechanism of gating through structural and functional analysis of the E. coli KefC. The revealed mechanism can explain how subtle chemical differences in glutathione derivatives can produce opposite effects on channel function. Kef channels are regulated by potassium transport and NAD-binding (KTN) domains that sense both reduced glutathione, which inhibits Kef activity, and glutathione adducts that form during electrophile detoxification and activate Kef. Roosild et al. (2010) found that reduced glutathione stabilizes an inter-domain association between two KTN folds, whereas large adducts sterically disrupt this interaction. F441 is identified as the pivotal residue discriminating between reduced glutathione and its conjugates. They demonstrated a major structural change on the binding of an activating ligand to a KTN-domain protein.

The MagA protein of Magnetospirillum sp. strain AMB-1 has been reported to be required for synthesis of bacterial magnetic particles. The magA gene is subject to transcriptional activation by an iron deficiency. However, a more recent report has shown that magA mutants of both Magnetospirillum magneticum AMB-1 and M. gryphiswaldense MSR-1 formed wild-type-like magnetosomes without a growth defect. Its transport function is not known. The GerN and GrmA proteins of Bacillus cereus and Bacillus megaterium, respectively, are spore germination proteins that can exchange Na^{+} for H^{+} and/or K^{+}. The AmhT homologue of Bacillus pseudofirmus transports both K^{+} and NH_{4}^{+}, influences ammonium homeostasis, and is required for normal sporulation and germination. The identification of these proteins as members of the CPA2 family reveals that monovalent cation transport is required for Bacillus spore formation and germination.

=== Transport Reaction ===
The generalized transport reaction catalyzed by members of the CPA2 family is:

M^{+} (in) + nH^{+} (out) ⇌ M^{+} (out) + nH^{+} (in).

(The carrier-mediated mode)

Some members may also catalyze:

M^{+} (in) ⇌ M^{+} (out).

(The channel-mediated mode)

== See also ==
- CPA superfamily
- Sodium-Proton antiporter
- Monovalent cation:Proton antiporter-1
- Monovalent cation:Proton antiporter-3
- Transporter Classification Database
