= Methylmalonyl-CoA decarboxylase =

methylmalonyl-CoA decarboxylase
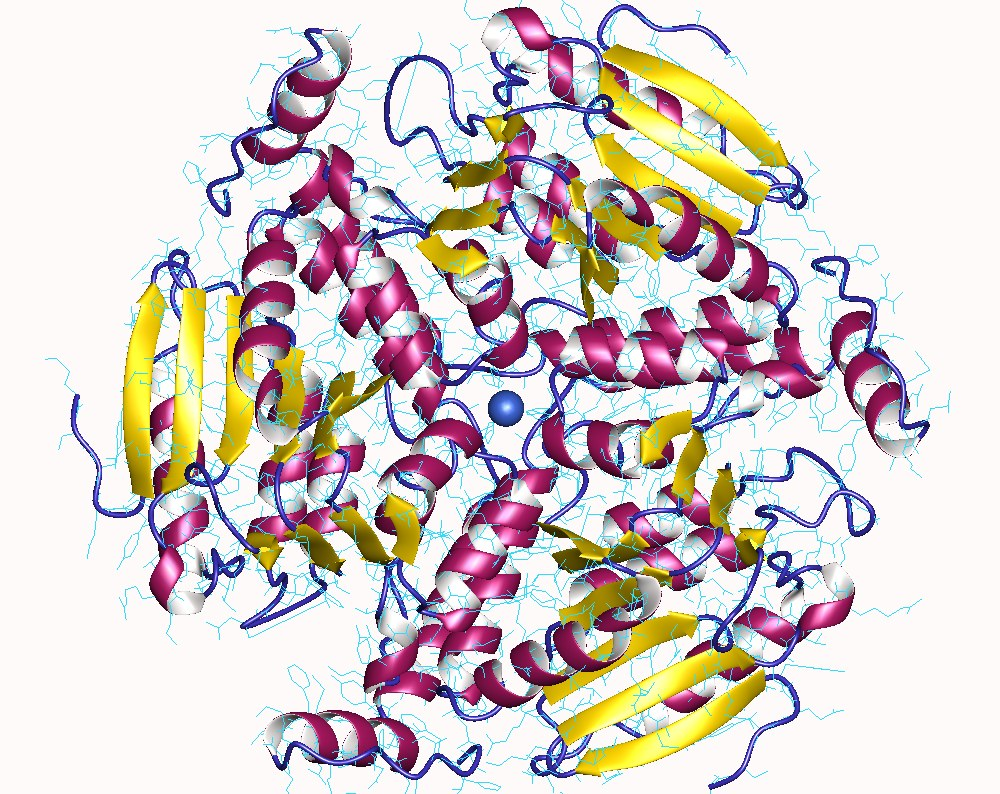
- Methylmalonyl CoA decarboxylase trimer, E.Coli

Identifiers
- EC no.: 7.2.4.3
- CAS no.: 37289-44-4

Databases
- IntEnz: IntEnz view
- BRENDA: BRENDA entry
- ExPASy: NiceZyme view
- KEGG: KEGG entry
- MetaCyc: metabolic pathway
- PRIAM: profile
- PDB structures: RCSB PDB PDBe PDBsum
- Gene Ontology: AmiGO / QuickGO
Search
- PMC: articles
- PubMed: articles
- NCBI: proteins

In enzymology, a methylmalonyl-CoA decarboxylase (EC 7.2.4.3) is an enzyme that catalyzes the chemical reaction

(S)-methylmalonyl-CoA $\rightleftharpoons$ propanoyl-CoA + CO_{2}

Hence, this enzyme has one substrate, (S)-methylmalonyl-CoA, and two products, propanoyl-CoA and CO_{2}. Along with this reaction, this enzyme transports sodium cations across the membrane, creating a gradient which can be used for synthesis of ATP, hence its classification as a translocase.

This enzyme belongs to the family of lyases, specifically the carboxy-lyases, which cleave carbon-carbon bonds. The systematic name of this enzyme class is (S)-methylmalonyl-CoA carboxy-lyase (propanoyl-CoA-forming). Other names in common use include propionyl-CoA carboxylase, propionyl coenzyme A carboxylase, methylmalonyl-coenzyme A decarboxylase, (S)-2-methyl-3-oxopropanoyl-CoA carboxy-lyase [incorrect], and (S)-methylmalonyl-CoA carboxy-lyase. This enzyme participates in propanoate metabolism.

== Structural studies ==
As of late 2007, two structures have been solved for this class of enzymes, with PDB accession codes 1EF8 and 1EF9.
