= List of EC numbers (EC 7) =

Enzyme Commission numbers

This list contains a list of sub-classes for the seventh group of Enzyme Commission numbers, EC 7, translocases, placed in numerical order as determined by the Nomenclature Committee of the International Union of Biochemistry and Molecular Biology. All official information is tabulated at the website of the committee. The database is developed and maintained by Andrew McDonald.

== EC 7.1: Catalysing the translocation of hydrons ==
NOTE: Hydron is a generic term that includes all isotopes of H^{+}, i.e. not only ^{1}H^{+} but also ^{2}H^{+} (D^{+}) and ^{3}H^{+} (T^{+}).

=== EC 7.1.1: Linked to oxidoreductase reactions ===
- EC 7.1.1.1: proton-translocating NAD(P)^{+} transhydrogenase
- EC 7.1.1.2: NADH:ubiquinone reductase (H^{+}-translocating)
- EC 7.1.1.3: ubiquinol oxidase (H^{+}-transporting)
- EC 7.1.1.4: caldariellaquinol oxidase (H^{+}-transporting)
- EC 7.1.1.5: menaquinol oxidase (H^{+}-transporting)
- EC 7.1.1.6: plastoquinol—plastocyanin reductase
- EC 7.1.1.7: quinol oxidase (electrogenic, proton-motive force generating)
- EC 7.1.1.8: quinol—cytochrome-c reductase
- EC 7.1.1.9: cytochrome-c oxidase
- EC 7.1.1.10: ferredoxin—quinone oxidoreductase (H^{+}-translocating)
- EC 7.1.1.11: ferredoxin—NAD^{+} oxidoreductase (H^{+}-transporting)

=== EC 7.1.2: Linked to the hydrolysis of a nucleoside triphosphate ===
- EC 7.1.2.1: P-type H^{+}-exporting transporter
- EC 7.1.2.2: H^{+}-transporting two-sector ATPase

=== EC 7.1.3: Linked to the hydrolysis of diphosphate ===
- EC 7.1.3.1: H^{+}-exporting diphosphatase
- EC 7.1.3.2: Na^{+}-exporting diphosphatase

== EC 7.2: catalysing the translocation of inorganic cations and their chelates ==
=== EC 7.2.1: Linked to oxidoreductase reactions ===
- EC 7.2.1.1: NADH:ubiquinone reductase (NAD^{+}-transporting)
- EC 7.2.1.2: ferredoxin—NAD^{+} oxidoreductase (NAD^{+}-transporting)
- EC 7.2.1.3: ascorbate ferrireductase (transmembrane)

=== EC 7.2.2: Linked to the hydrolysis of a nucleoside triphosphate ===
- EC 7.2.2.1: Na^{+}-transporting two-sector ATPase
- EC 7.2.2.2: ABC-type Cd^{2+} transporter
- EC 7.2.2.3: P-type Na^{+} transporter
- EC 7.2.2.4: ABC-type Na^{+} transporter
- EC 7.2.2.5: ABC-type Mn^{2+} transporter
- EC 7.2.2.6: P-type K^{+} transporter
- EC 7.2.2.7: ABC-type Fe^{2+} transporter
- EC 7.2.2.8: P-type Cu^{+} transporter
- EC 7.2.2.9: P-type Cu^{2+} transporter
- EC 7.2.2.10: P-type Ca^{2+} transporter
- EC 7.2.2.11: ABC-type Ni^{2+} transporter
- EC 7.2.2.12: P-type Zn^{2+} transporter
- EC 7.2.2.13: Na^{+}/K^{+}-exchanging ATPase
- EC 7.2.2.14: P-type Mg^{2+} transporter
- EC 7.2.2.15: P-type Ag^{+} transporter
- EC 7.2.2.16: ABC-type ferric hydroxamate transporter
- EC 7.2.2.17: ABC-type ferric enterobactin transporter
- EC 7.2.2.18: ABC-type ferric citrate transporter
- EC 7.2.2.19: H^{+}/K^{+}-exchanging ATPase
- EC 7.2.2.20: ABC-type Zn^{2+} transporter
- EC 7.2.2.21: Cd^{2+}-exporting ATPase
- EC 7.2.2.22: P-type Mn^{2+} transporter

=== EC 7.2.4: Linked to decarboxylation ===
- EC 7.2.4.1: carboxybiotin decarboxylase
- EC 7.2.4.2: oxaloacetate decarboxylase (Na^{+} extruding)
- EC 7.2.4.3: (S)-methylmalonyl-CoA decarboxylase (sodium-transporting)
- EC 7.2.4.4: biotin-dependent malonate decarboxylase
- EC 7.2.4.5: glutaconyl-CoA decarboxylase *

== EC 7.3: Catalysing the translocation of inorganic anions ==
=== EC 7.3.2: Linked to the hydrolysis of a nucleoside triphosphate ===
- EC 7.3.2.1: ABC-type phosphate transporter
- EC 7.3.2.2: ABC-type phosphonate transporter
- EC 7.3.2.3: ABC-type sulfate transporter
- EC 7.3.2.4: ABC-type nitrate transporter
- EC 7.3.2.5: ABC-type molybdate transporter
- EC 7.3.2.6: ABC-type tungstate transporter
- EC 7.3.2.7: arsenite-transporting ATPase

== EC 7.4: Catalysing the translocation of amino acids and peptides ==
=== EC 7.4.2: Linked to the hydrolysis of a nucleoside triphosphate ===
- EC 7.4.2.1: ABC-type polar-amino-acid transporter
- EC 7.4.2.2: ABC-type nonpolar-amino-acid transporter
- EC 7.4.2.3: mitochondrial protein-transporting ATPase
- EC 7.4.2.4: chloroplast protein-transporting ATPase
- EC 7.4.2.5: bacterial ABC-type protein transporter
- EC 7.4.2.6: ABC-type oligopeptide transporter
- EC 7.4.2.7: ABC-type α-factor-pheromone transporter
- EC 7.4.2.8: protein-secreting ATPase
- EC 7.4.2.9: ABC-type dipeptide transporter
- EC 7.4.2.10: ABC-type glutathione transporter
- EC 7.4.2.11: ABC-type methionine transporter
- EC 7.4.2.12: ABC-type cystine transporter
- EC 7.4.2.13: ABC-type tyrosine transporter
- EC 7.4.2.14: ABC-type antigen peptide transporter

== EC 7.5: Catalysing the translocation of carbohydrates and their derivatives ==
=== EC 7.5.2: Linked to the hydrolysis of a nucleoside triphosphate ===
- EC 7.5.2.1: ABC-type maltose transporter
- EC 7.5.2.2: ABC-type oligosaccharide transporter
- EC 7.5.2.3: ABC-type β-glucan transporter
- EC 7.5.2.4: ABC-type teichoic-acid transporter
- EC 7.5.2.5: ABC-type lipopolysaccharide transporter
- EC 7.5.2.6: ABC-type lipid A-core oligosaccharide transporter
- EC 7.5.2.7: ABC-type D-ribose transporter
- EC 7.5.2.8: ABC-type D-allose transporter
- EC 7.5.2.9: ABC-type D-galactofuranose transporter
- EC 7.5.2.10: ABC-type D-xylose transporter
- EC 7.5.2.11: ABC-type D-galactose transporter
- EC 7.5.2.12: ABC-type L-arabinose transporter
- EC 7.5.2.13: ABC-type D-xylose/L-arabinose transporter

== EC 7.6: Catalysing the translocation of other compounds ==
=== EC 7.6.2: Linked to the hydrolysis of a nucleoside triphosphate ===
- EC 7.6.2.1: P-type phospholipid transporter
- EC 7.6.2.2: ABC-type xenobiotic transporter
- EC 7.6.2.3: ABC-type glutathione-S-conjugate transporter
- EC 7.6.2.4: ABC-type fatty-acyl-CoA transporter
- EC 7.6.2.5: ABC-type heme transporter
- EC 7.6.2.6: ABC-type guanine transporter
- EC 7.6.2.7: ABC-type taurine transporter
- EC 7.6.2.8: ABC-type vitamin B_{12} transporter
- EC 7.6.2.9: ABC-type quaternary amine transporter
- EC 7.6.2.10: ABC-type glycerol 3-phosphate transporter
- EC 7.6.2.11: ABC-type polyamine transporter
- EC 7.6.2.12: ABC-type capsular-polysaccharide transporter
- EC 7.6.2.13: ABC-type autoinducer-2 transporter
- EC 7.6.2.14: ABC-type aliphatic sulfonate transporter
- EC 7.6.2.15: ABC-type thiamine transporter
- EC 7.6.2.16: ABC-type putrescine transporter
