= RIOK1 =

Protein-coding gene in humans

Identifiers
- Aliases: RIOK1, AD034, RRP10, bA288G3.1, RIO kinase 1, RIO1
- External IDs: OMIM: 617753; MGI: 1918590; GeneCards: RIOK1
Available structures
PDB	Ortholog search: PDBe RCSB
PDB	List of PDB id codes 4OTP
Enzyme activity
EC #	BRENDA	ExPASy	KEGG	MetaCyc
2.7.11.1	↗	↗	↗	↗

Gene location (Human)
Chr.	Chromosome 6 (human)
Band	6p24.3	Start	7,389,793 bp
Band	6p24.3	End	7,418,037 bp

Gene location (Mouse)
Chr.	Chromosome 13 (mouse)
Band	13|13 A3.3	Start	38,220,971 bp
Band	13|13 A3.3	End	38,245,409 bp
RNA expression pattern
Bgee	Human / Mouse (ortholog); Top expressed in: pancreatic epithelial cell; gonad; secondary oocyte; testicle; tibialis anterior muscle; gingival epithelium; Achilles tendon; pancreatic ductal cell; skin of abdomen; left testis / Top expressed in: zygote; primary oocyte; secondary oocyte; genital tubercle; tail of embryo; granulocyte; Rostral migratory stream; spermatocyte; renal corpuscle; spermatid; More reference expression data
BioGPS	n/a
Gene ontology
Molecular function	transferase activity; nucleotide binding; protein serine/threonine kinase activity; protein binding; ATP binding; metal ion binding; kinase activity; hydrolase activity
Cellular component	nucleoplasm; cytoplasm; preribosome, small subunit precursor; cytosol; methyltransferase complex
Biological process	protein phosphorylation; phosphorylation; maturation of SSU-rRNA; ribosome biogenesis; ribosomal small subunit biogenesis; positive regulation of rRNA processing
Sources:Amigo / QuickGO
Orthologs
Databases	NCBI: entry; OMA: entry
Species	Human	Mouse
Entrez	83732	71340
Ensembl	ENSG00000124784	ENSMUSG00000021428
UniProt	Q9BRS2	Q922Q2
RefSeq (mRNA)	NM_031480; NM_153005; NM_001348194	NM_024242
RefSeq (protein)	NP_113668; NP_001335123	NP_077204
Location (UCSC)	Chr 6: 7.39 – 7.42 Mb	Chr 13: 38.22 – 38.25 Mb
PubMed search
- Wikidata
View/Edit Human	View/Edit Mouse

Serine/threonine-protein kinase RIO1 is an enzyme that in humans is encoded by the RIOK1 gene.

RIOK1 is an atypical protein, which exists in most archaea and eukaryotes. It belongs to the serine/threonine-specific protein kinase family.

It has been intensely studied to understand the maturation they promote on small ribosomal subunits (SSU). It is suggested that over-expression or mutations of the RIOK 1 gene may cause mis-regulation of its network (in metazoans - large signaling network at the protein and gene levels via which it stimulates or restricts growth and division in response to nutrient availability). This was observed in primary cancer cells and may contribute to cancer initiation and progression.

== Characteristics ==
RIOK 1 has a molecular weight of 65,583 Da, a basal isoelectric point of 5.84 (predict pI for various phosphorylation states; pI for unphosphorylated state = 5.84), and a chromosomal location of human orthodox 6p24.3. (6:7,389,496-7,418,037)

=== PTM Effects ===
Effects on modified protein - protein degradation, triggered by K411-m1; protein stabilization, triggered by T410-p; ubiquitination, triggered by K411-m1.

Effects on biological progress - cell growth, inhibited, triggered by K411-m1.

=== Mutagenesis ===
The effect of the experimental mutation of one or more amino acid(s) on the biological properties of the protein. When amino acid residues are altered, we report the change, the name of the mutant (if known), and the effects of the mutation on the protein, the cell or the complete organism. Examples: Q1LCS4, P04395, Q38914.

When the mutation is associated with several point mutations, we add the exact combination of mutations (positions and amino acid modifications). Examples: P62166, O14776.

The mutation (D324A) in RIOK1 abolishes autophosphorylation activity, enhances association with pre-40S ribosomal subunits and inhibits processing of 18S-E pre-rRNA to the mature 18S rRNA.

=== Conservation ===
Looking at the multiple sequence alignment (aligned using Clustal Omega) it is possible to compare the modified residues, in the red boxes, from three different RIOK 1: human, mouse and rat.

== Function ==
=== Immune Repressor ===
Despite the fact that RIOK1 functions remain unclear, it's been discovered that the lack of this protein grants resistance to a certain type of bacteria called Aeromonas, which shows its function as an immune repressor.

The feedback loop is the model which RIOK1 allows the inhibition of our immune system against bacteria among p38 MAPK and SKN-1. Microorganism presence active the p38 MAPK pathway increasing the concentration of SKN-1, which will end up producing the necessary amount of RIOK1 to stop this pathway.

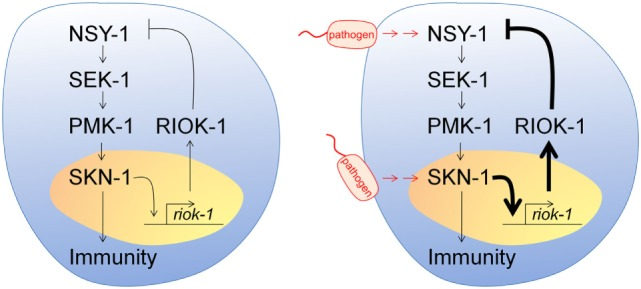

=== RNA Maturation ===
In addition, RIOK1 has also a potential role with the metabolism of the 40S ribosomal subunit, precisely, we know it's involved in the maturation of the 40S ribosomal subunit and needed for the recycling of PNO1 and NOB1, which are both RNA-binding proteins from 40S precursors.

=== Protein Binding ===
Furthermore, RIOK1 protein binding function stands out among other proteins involved in the same activity. For instance, in the binding of PRMT5 in which RIOK1 and PICln are involved, suggest that RIOK1 is a more general adapter than PICln. RIOK1 also interacts with NCL via its C-terminus, which targets NCL for PRMT5 methylation. RioK1 binds to a shallow groove of the TIM barrel domain of PRMT5 via its N-terminal sequence VPGQFDDAD (residues 12–20). The binding amino acid sequence was used as a basis for synthesis of a macrocyclic inhibitor of protein-protein interactions between PRMT5 and its adaptor proteins.

=== lists of the major functions and processes of RIOK1 ===
==== Functions ====
- ATP binding
- Hydrolase activity
- Metal ion binding
- Protein binding
- Protein serine/kerotonine kinase activity

==== Processes it's involved ====
- Maturation of SSUU-rRNA
- Positive regulation of rRNA processing
- Protein Phosphorylation
- Ribosomal small subunit biogenesis

== Location and structure ==
RIOK1 is the only component of the PRMT5 complex located exclusively in the cytoplasm.

=== Tissue expression ===
The protein Kinase RIO1 highest expression is in testicles, in addition the RNA that encodes this protein has low tissue especifity, as it is detected in every kind of tissue, but mostly in the pituitary gland, testicles, skeletal muscle, thymus and NK-cells (RIOK1 tissue expression)

=== Sequence and primary structure ===
RIOK1 gene has 5 different transcripts but only transcript variant 1 (mRNA) (RIOK1-202) contains an ORF (NCBI GenBank), whose origin sequence is formed of 17 coding exons (represented in red):

                    

RIOK1 transcript variant 1 encodes the protein kinase RIO1 (isoform 1) which contains 568 aminoacids (NCBI GenPept). As the result of posttranslational modifications the protein Kinase RIO1 has 2 phosphoserines in positions 21 and 22

=== Secondary Structure ===
Its secondary structure consist of 9 alpha helix (red) and 7 beta strands (blue) (Protein Data Bank in Europe )

                    

=== Native State ===
RIOK1 belongs to the serine/threonine-specific protein kinase family and therefore has the protein kinase domain in positions 180–479

It is an holoenzyme that uses Mg(+2) as its cofactor

==== Sites ====
This enzyme has 3 binding sites in positions 208 (for ATP), 278 (for ATP via carbonyl oxygen) and 280 (for ATP via nitrogen amide); 2 metal binding sites [Mg(+2)] in positions 329 and 349 and 2 active sites in positions 324 (which is a proton acceptor) and 341 (4-aspartylphosphate intermediate)
