= Glutaryl-CoA dehydrogenase (non-decarboxylating) =

Identifiers
- EC no.: 1.3.99.32

Databases
- IntEnz: IntEnz view
- BRENDA: BRENDA entry
- ExPASy: NiceZyme view
- KEGG: KEGG entry
- MetaCyc: metabolic pathway
- PRIAM: profile
- PDB structures: RCSB PDB PDBe PDBsum
Search
- PMC: articles
- PubMed: articles
- NCBI: proteins

Glutaryl-CoA dehydrogenase (non-decarboxylating) (EC 1.3.99.32, GDHDes, nondecarboxylating glutaryl-coenzyme A dehydrogenase, nondecarboxylating glutaconyl-coenzyme A-forming GDH) is an enzyme with systematic name glutaryl-CoA:acceptor 2,3-oxidoreductase (non-decarboxylating). This enzyme catalyses the following chemical reaction

glutaryl-CoA + acceptor $\rightleftharpoons$ (E)-glutaconyl-CoA + reduced acceptor

The enzyme contains FAD.
