= List of proteins =

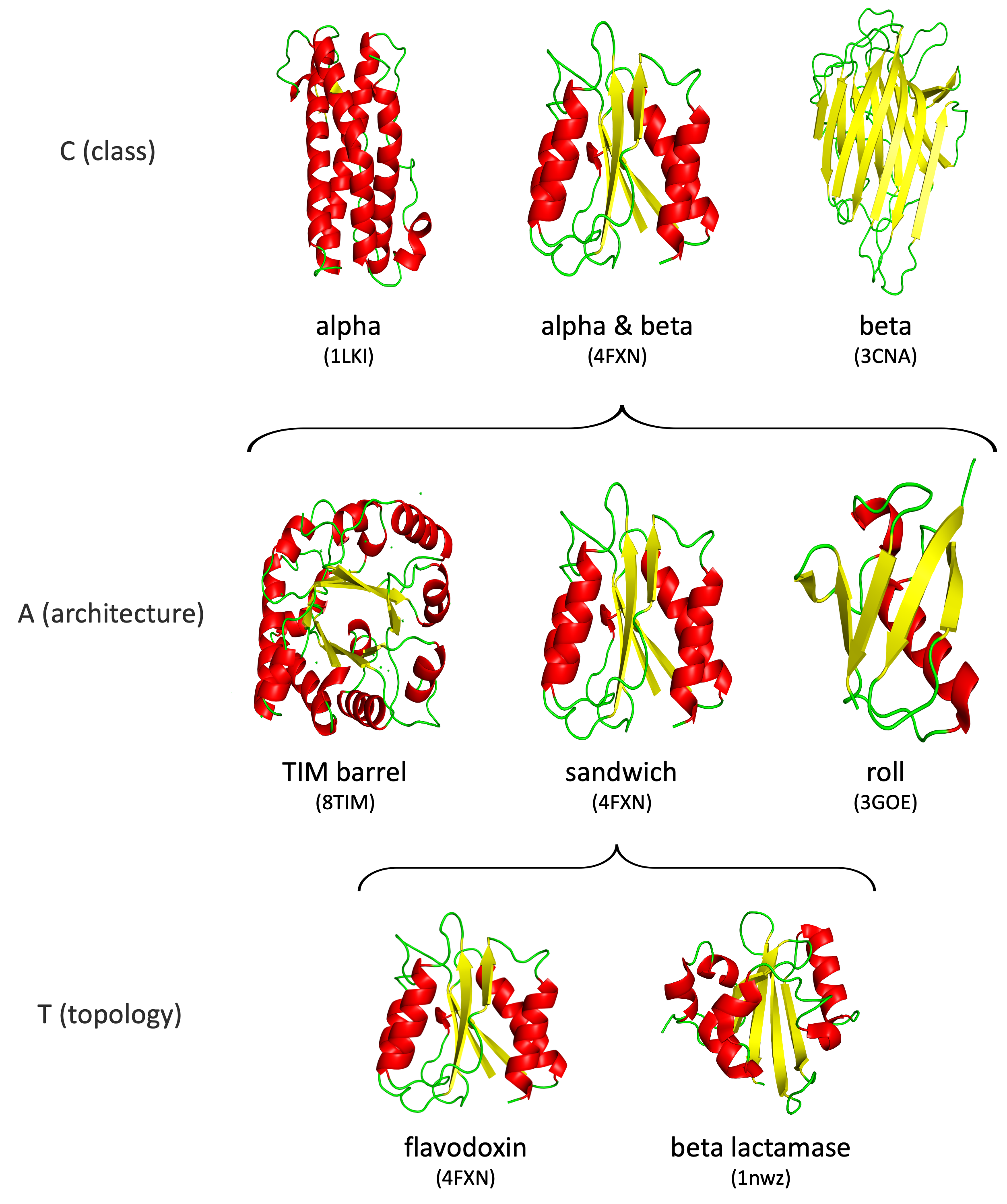
Schematic representation of structural classes of protein according to the CATH classification scheme.

Proteins are a class of macromolecular organic compounds that are essential to life. They consist of a long polypeptide chain that usually adopts a single stable three-dimensional structure. They fulfill a wide variety of functions including providing structural stability to cells, catalyzing chemical reactions that produce or store energy or synthesize other biomolecules including nucleic acids and proteins, transporting essential nutrients, or serving other roles such as signal transduction. They are selectively transported to various compartments of the cell or in some cases, secreted from the cell.

This list aims to organize information on how proteins are most often classified: by structure, by function, or by location.

== Structure ==
Proteins may be classified as to their three-dimensional structure (also known a protein fold). The two most widely used classification schemes are:

- CATH database
- Structural Classification of Proteins database (SCOP)

Both classification schemes are based on a hierarchy of fold types. At the top level are all alpha proteins (domains consisting of alpha helices), all beta proteins (domains consisting of beta sheets), and mixed alpha helix/beta sheet proteins.

While most proteins adopt a single stable fold, a few proteins can rapidly interconvert between one or more folds. These are referred to as metamorphic proteins. Finally other proteins appear not to adopt any stable conformation and are referred to as intrinsically disordered.

Proteins frequently contain two or more domains, each have a different fold separated by intrinsically disordered regions. These are referred to as multi-domain proteins.

== Function ==
The human genome, categorized by function of each gene product, given both as number of genes and as percentage of all genes.

Proteins may also be classified based on their cellular function. A widely used classification is PANTHER (protein analysis through evolutionary relationships) classification system.

=== Catalytic ===
Enzymes classified according to their Enzyme Commission number (EC). Note that strictly speaking, an EC number corresponds to the reaction the enzyme catalyzes, not the protein per se. However each EC number has been mapped to one or more specific proteins.

- List of enzymes
- EC 1: Oxidoreductases
- EC 2: Transferases
- EC 3: Hydrolases
- EC 4: Lyases
- EC 5: Isomerases
- EC 6: Ligases
- EC 7: Translocases

=== Transport ===
Transport Enzyme

- Ion channel
- Solute carrier family

=== Immune ===
- Acute phase protein
- Antibody
- Chemokines and their receptors
- Cytokines and their receptors
- MHC Class I
- MHC Class II
- Pattern recognition receptors
- Complement System
- Iglv6-57

=== Genetic ===
- DNA/RNA synthesis
- DNA repair
- replication
- transcription (Transcription factor, transcriptional coregulator)

=== Signal transduction ===
Signal transduction

== Sub-cellular distribution ==
The human genome, categorized by the predicted subcellular location distribution of each gene product.

Proteins may also be classified by which subcellular compartment they are found.

=== Nuclear ===
Nuclear proteins

=== Cytosolic ===
Cytosolic proteins

=== Cytoskeletal ===
Cytoskeletal proteins

=== Organelle ===
==== Endoplasmic reticulum ====
Endoplasmic reticulum resident protein

==== Mitochondrial ====
Mitochondrial DNA that encode mitochondrial proteins (note that some mitochondrial proteins are encoded by nuclear DNA)

==== Chloroplast ====
Chloroplast DNA that encode chloroplast proteins

=== Cell membrane ===
Membrane protein

- Integral membrane protein
- Peripheral membrane protein

=== Extracellular matrix ===
Extracellular matrix proteins

=== Plasma ===
Blood protein

== Species distribution ==
- Mammalian proteins
- Vertebrate proteins
- Plant proteins
- Bacterial proteins
- Archaeal proteins
- Viral proteins
