= Anvumetostat =

Investigational drug

Anvumetostat INN: anvumetostat

Clinical data
- Other names: AMG-193

Identifiers
- IUPAC name: (4-amino-1,3-dihydrofuro[3,4-c][1,7]naphthyridin-8-yl)-[(3S)-3-[4-(trifluoromethyl)phenyl]morpholin-4-yl]methanone
- CAS Number: 2790567-82-5
- PubChem CID: 164536956
- UNII: QAT649EJ5E
- ChEMBL: ChEMBL6134011
- PDB ligand: A1ATH (PDBe, RCSB PDB)

Chemical and physical data
- Formula: C_{22}H_{19}F_{3}N_{4}O_{3}
- Molar mass: 444.414 g·mol^{−1}
- 3D model (JSmol): Interactive image
- SMILES: C1COC[C@@H](N1C(=O)C2=NC=C3C(=C2)C4=C(COC4)C(=N3)N)C5=CC=C(C=C5)C(F)(F)F
- InChI: InChI=InChI=1S/C22H19F3N4O3/c23-22(24,25)13-3-1-12(2-4-13)19-11-31-6-5-29(19)21(30)17-7-14-15-9-32-10-16(15)20(26)28-18(14)8-27-17/h1-4,7-8,19H,5-6,9-11H2,(H2,26,28)/t19-/m1/s1; Key:BFEBTMFPRJPBTK-LJQANCHMSA-N

Anvumetostat is an investigational new drug that is being developed by Amgen for the treatment of methylthioadenosine phosphorylase (MTAP)-null solid tumors. Anvumetostat acts as a PRMT5 inhibitor.
