= PRT543 =

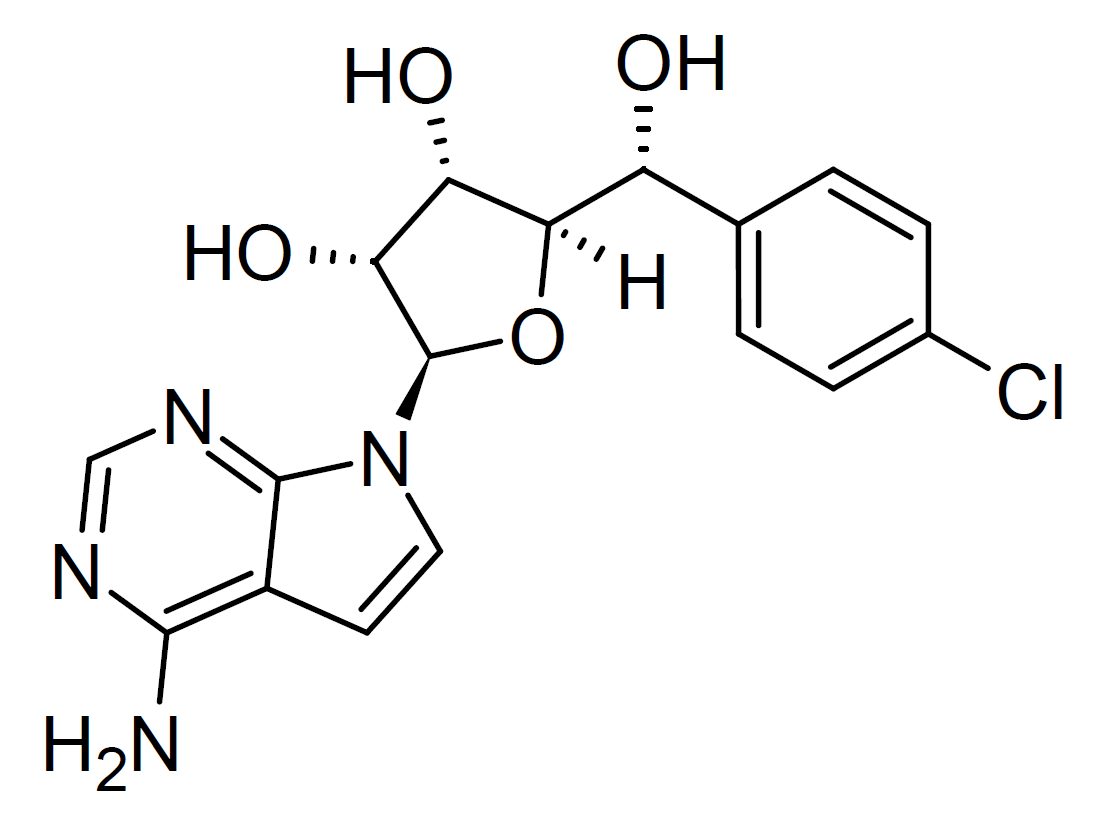

Identifiers
- IUPAC name: (2R,3R,4S,5R)-2-(4-aminopyrrolo[2,3-d]pyrimidin-7-yl)-5-[(R)-(4-chlorophenyl)-hydroxymethyl]oxolane-3,4-diol
- CAS Number: 1989620-03-2
- PubChem CID: 122497020
- ChemSpider: 128941842
- ChEMBL: ChEMBL4585781

Chemical and physical data
- Formula: C_{17}H_{17}ClN_{4}O_{4}
- Molar mass: 376.80 g·mol^{−1}
- 3D model (JSmol): Interactive image
- SMILES: C1=CC(=CC=C1[C@H]([C@@H]2[C@H]([C@H]([C@@H](O2)N3C=CC4=C(N=CN=C43)N)O)O)O)Cl
- InChI: InChI=1S/C17H17ClN4O4/c18-9-3-1-8(2-4-9)11(23)14-12(24)13(25)17(26-14)22-6-5-10-15(19)20-7-21-16(10)22/h1-7,11-14,17,23-25H,(H2,19,20,21)/t11-,12+,13-,14-,17-/m1/s1; Key:ITEKIFMGFZAFPM-QFRSUPTLSA-N

PRT543 is an experimental anticancer drug which acts as an inhibitor of the enzyme protein arginine methyltransferase 5. This protein is involved in repairs to DNA following damage, so inhibiting it makes cancer cells more susceptible to other chemotherapy drugs. PRT543 is in early stage clinical trials against adenoid cystic carcinoma.
