= ABC-type ferric hydroxamate transporter =

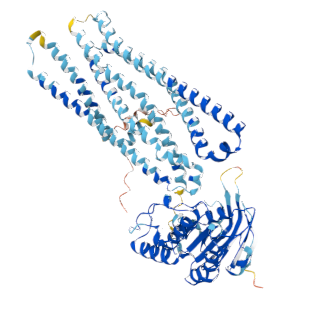
- The translocase as folded by AlphaFold

Identifiers
- EC no.: 7.2.2.16

Databases
- BRENDA: enzyme data
- ExPASy: NiceZyme view
- KEGG: enzyme entry
- MetaCyc: metabolic pathway
- Rhea: reactions
- PDB structures: RCSB PDB PDBe PDBsum
Search
- PMC: articles
- PubMed: articles
- NCBI: proteins

The ABC-type ferric hydroxamate transporter, (known also as the iron(III) hydroxamate ABC transporter and ATP phosphohydrolase [ABC-type, iron(III) hydroxamate-importing]) is a translocase enzyme expressed in the cell membranes of bacterial and animal cells. The enzyme possesses an ATP Cassette, indicated by the presence of two similar triphosphate-binding residues and two functional integral membrane domains. It has been observed as a bacterial protein that binds with an extracellular binding protein and facilitates the import of Fe3+-complexed hydroxamate siderophores (ion-chelating complexes like coprogen, ferrichrome and the ferric hydroxamate antibiotic, albomycin). The enzyme catalyzes the following chemical reaction

ATP + H20 + Iron-Hydroxamate complex hydroxamate-binding protein (side 1) = ADP + phosphate + Iron-Hydroxamate complex hydroxamate-binding protein (side 2)

Note that 'side 1' and 'side 2' correspond to different compartments, or sides of the cell membrane through which the enzyme translocates. The enzyme is involved in various important pathways, including toluene degradation, androgen and estrogen metabolism, biotin biosynthesis, cellulose degradation, cysteine metabolism and lipid metabolism. In e. coli, the enzyme is encoded by b0151(fhuC)
