= MADB =

Madb or MADB can refer to:

Mythology

- Medb, an Irish legendary figure in Proto-Indo-European religion, also called Queen Maeve

Science and medicine

- madB, a protein-encoding gene in Phycomyces blakesleeanus
- Mandibuloacral dysplasia with type B lipodystrophy, a type of Laminopathy
- Carboxybiotin decarboxylase, an enzyme

Acronyms

- Myanma Agricultural Development Bank
- Minor actinide property database Integrated Nuclear Fuel Cycle Information System#Modules
- Magyar agár database
- Microarray database
- Message Addressing Database, for WS-Addressing
- Material Acquisition Database
