= ABC-type oligopeptide transporter =

Class of enzymes

Identifiers
- EC no.: 7.4.2.6

Databases
- BRENDA: enzyme data
- ExPASy: NiceZyme view
- KEGG: enzyme entry
- MetaCyc: metabolic pathway
- Rhea: reactions
- PDB structures: RCSB PDB PDBe PDBsum
- Gene Ontology: AmiGO / QuickGO
Search
- PMC: articles
- PubMed: articles
- NCBI: proteins

The ABC-type oligopeptide transporter (EC 7.4.2.6) or oligopeptide permease is an enzyme that catalyzes the chemical reaction

ATP + H_{2}O + oligopeptide(out) $\rightleftharpoons$ ADP + phosphate + oligopeptide(in)

The 3 substrates of this enzyme are ATP, H_{2}O, and oligopeptide, whereas its 3 products are ADP, phosphate, and oligopeptide.

This enzyme belongs to the family of hydrolases, specifically those acting on acid anhydrides to catalyse transmembrane movement of substances. The systematic name of this enzyme class is ATP phosphohydrolase (ABC-type, oligopeptide-importing).

== See also ==
- Bacterial binding protein-dependent transporter
