= CTDP1 =

Mammalian protein found in Homo sapiens

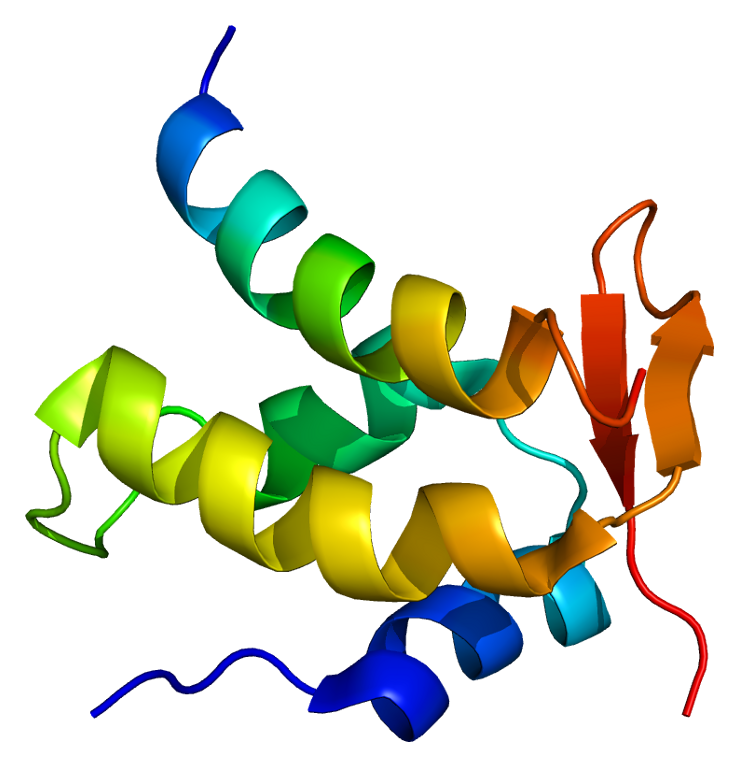

Identifiers
- Aliases: CTDP1, CCFDN, FCP1, CTD phosphatase subunit 1
- External IDs: OMIM: 604927; MGI: 1926953; GeneCards: CTDP1
Available structures
PDB	Ortholog search: PDBe RCSB
PDB	List of PDB id codes 1J2X, 1ONV, 2K7L
Enzyme activity
EC #	BRENDA	ExPASy	KEGG	MetaCyc
3.1.3.16	↗	↗	↗	↗

Gene location (Human)
Chr.	Chromosome 18 (human)
Band	18q23	Start	79,679,803 bp
Band	18q23	End	79,754,503 bp

Gene location (Mouse)
Chr.	Chromosome 18 (mouse)
Band	18 E3|18 53.48 cM	Start	80,451,174 bp
Band	18 E3|18 53.48 cM	End	80,512,910 bp
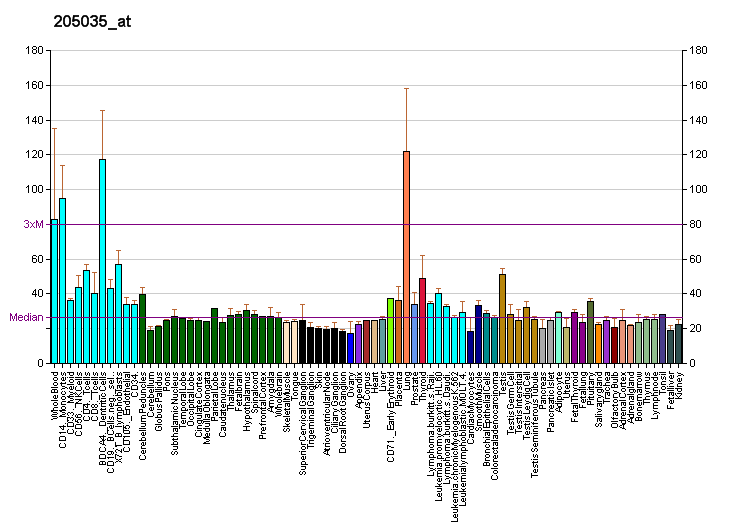
RNA expression pattern
Bgee	Human / Mouse (ortholog); Top expressed in: left testis; right testis; skin of leg; oocyte; granulocyte; blood; mucosa of transverse colon; skin of abdomen; secondary oocyte; monocyte / Top expressed in: spermatid; otic vesicle; epiblast; fetal liver hematopoietic progenitor cell; hair follicle; seminiferous tubule; Gonadal ridge; primitive streak; somite; Paneth cell; More reference expression data
BioGPS	More reference expression data
Gene ontology
Molecular function	RNA polymerase II CTD heptapeptide repeat phosphatase activity; protein binding; hydrolase activity; phosphoprotein phosphatase activity; TFIIF-class transcription factor complex binding; Tat protein binding
Cellular component	cytoplasm; centrosome; spindle pole; RNA polymerase II, holoenzyme; spindle; microtubule organizing center; midbody; spindle midzone; cytoskeleton; nucleus; nucleoplasm; intracellular membrane-bounded organelle; protein-containing complex; actin cytoskeleton; nuclear speck
Biological process	transcription elongation from RNA polymerase II promoter; protein dephosphorylation; exit from mitosis; transcription by RNA polymerase II; cell division; negative regulation of cell growth involved in cardiac muscle cell development; dephosphorylation of RNA polymerase II C-terminal domain; cell cycle; positive regulation by host of viral transcription; positive regulation of viral transcription
Sources:Amigo / QuickGO
Orthologs
Databases	NCBI: entry; OMA: entry
Species	Human	Mouse
Entrez	9150	67655
Ensembl	ENSG00000282752; ENSG00000060069	ENSMUSG00000033323
UniProt	Q9Y5B0	Q7TSG2
RefSeq (mRNA)	NM_001202504; NM_004715; NM_048368; NM_001318511	NM_026295
RefSeq (protein)	NP_001189433; NP_001305440; NP_004706; NP_430255	NP_080571
Location (UCSC)	Chr 18: 79.68 – 79.75 Mb	Chr 18: 80.45 – 80.51 Mb
PubMed search
- Wikidata
View/Edit Human	View/Edit Mouse

RNA polymerase II subunit A C-terminal domain phosphatase is an enzyme that in humans is encoded by the CTDP1 gene.

This gene encodes a protein which interacts with the carboxy-terminus of transcription initiation factor TFIIF, a transcription factor which regulates elongation as well as initiation by RNA polymerase II. The protein may also represent a component of an RNA polymerase II holoenzyme complex. Alternative splicing of this gene results in two transcript variants encoding 2 different isoforms.

== Interactions ==
CTDP1 has been shown to interact with WD repeat-containing protein 77, GTF2F1 and POLR2A.
