= Glutaconate CoA-transferase =

Class of enzymes

glutaconate CoA-transferase

Identifiers
- EC no.: 2.8.3.12
- CAS no.: 79078-99-2

Databases
- IntEnz: IntEnz view
- BRENDA: BRENDA entry
- ExPASy: NiceZyme view
- KEGG: KEGG entry
- MetaCyc: metabolic pathway
- PRIAM: profile
- PDB structures: RCSB PDB PDBe PDBsum
- Gene Ontology: AmiGO / QuickGO
Search
- PMC: articles
- PubMed: articles
- NCBI: proteins

In enzymology, a glutaconate CoA-transferase (EC 2.8.3.12) is an enzyme that catalyzes the chemical reaction

acetyl-CoA + (E)-glutaconate $\rightleftharpoons$ acetate + glutaconyl-1-CoA

Thus, the two substrates of this enzyme are acetyl-CoA and (E)-glutaconate, whereas its two products are acetate and glutaconyl-1-CoA.

This enzyme belongs to the family of transferases, specifically the CoA-transferases. The systematic name of this enzyme class is acetyl-CoA:(E)-glutaconate CoA-transferase. This enzyme participates in styrene degradation and butanoate metabolism.
