= CLNS1A =

Protein-coding gene in humans

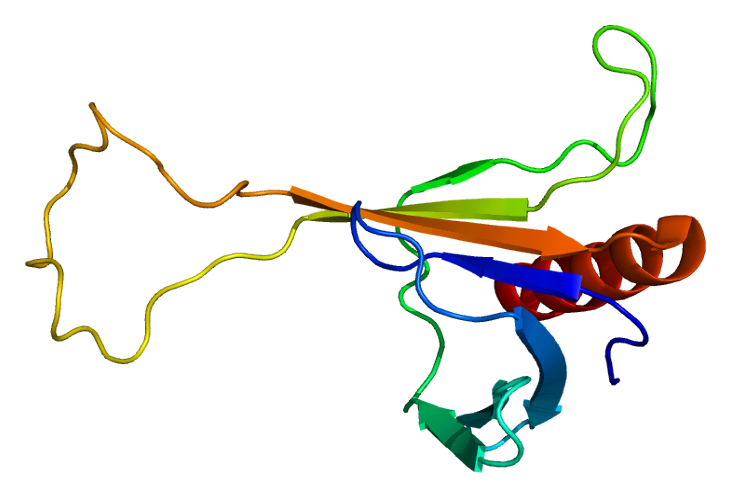

Identifiers
- Aliases: CLNS1A, CLCI, CLNS1B, ICln, chloride nucleotide-sensitive channel 1A
- External IDs: OMIM: 602158; MGI: 109638; GeneCards: CLNS1A

Gene location (Human)
Chr.	Chromosome 11 (human)
Band	11q14.1	Start	77,514,936 bp
Band	11q14.1	End	77,637,794 bp

Gene location (Mouse)
Chr.	Chromosome 7 (mouse)
Band	7 E1|7 53.57 cM	Start	97,345,841 bp
Band	7 E1|7 53.57 cM	End	97,370,003 bp
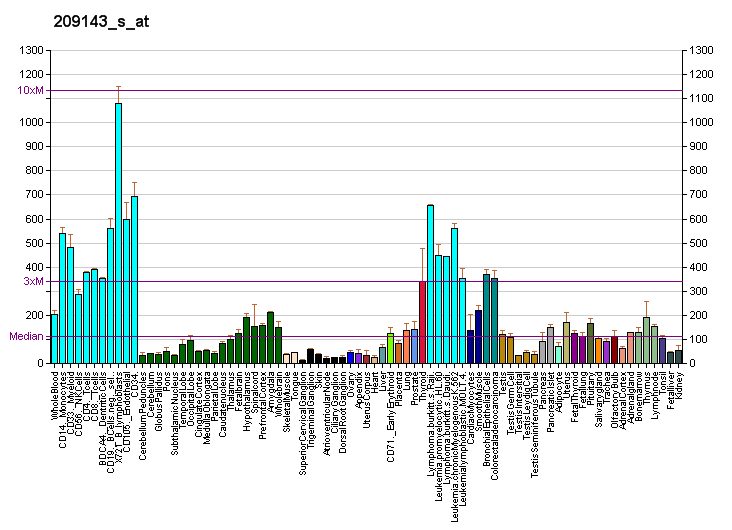
RNA expression pattern
Bgee	Human / Mouse (ortholog); Top expressed in: ventricular zone; Achilles tendon; ganglionic eminence; body of pancreas; right adrenal gland; right adrenal cortex; left ovary; C1 segment; left adrenal gland; monocyte / Top expressed in: motor neuron; primitive streak; medial ganglionic eminence; condyle; fossa; vestibular membrane of cochlear duct; hair follicle; Rostral migratory stream; renal corpuscle; internal carotid artery; More reference expression data
BioGPS	More reference expression data
Gene ontology
Molecular function	protein heterodimerization activity; protein binding; RNA binding
Cellular component	plasma membrane; cytoskeleton; nucleoplasm; nucleus; methylosome; pICln-Sm protein complex; cytosol; cytoplasm
Biological process	cell volume homeostasis; chloride transport; spliceosomal snRNP assembly
Sources:Amigo / QuickGO
Orthologs
Databases	NCBI: entry; OMA: entry
Species	Human	Mouse
Entrez	1207	12729
Ensembl	ENSG00000074201	ENSMUSG00000025439
UniProt	P54105	Q61189; Q923F1
RefSeq (mRNA)	NM_001311202; NM_001293; NM_001311199; NM_001311200; NM_001311201	NM_023671
RefSeq (protein)	NP_001284; NP_001298128; NP_001298129; NP_001298130; NP_001298131	NP_076160
Location (UCSC)	Chr 11: 77.51 – 77.64 Mb	Chr 7: 97.35 – 97.37 Mb
PubMed search
- Wikidata
View/Edit Human	View/Edit Mouse

Methylosome subunit pICln is a protein that in humans is encoded by the CLNS1A gene.

== Interactions ==
CLNS1A has been shown to interact with:

- ITGA2B,
- PRMT5,
- SNRPD1, and
- SNRPD3.

== See also ==
- Chloride channel
