= Navlimetostat =

Investigational drug

Clinical data
- Other names: MRTX-1719

Identifiers
- IUPAC name: (2M)-2-{4-[4-(Aminomethyl)-1-oxo-1,2-dihydrophthalazin-6-yl]-1-methyl-1H-pyrazol-5-yl}-4-chloro-6-(cyclopropyloxy)-3-fluorobenzonitrile
- CAS Number: 2630904-44-6
- PubChem CID: 156151242
- IUPHAR/BPS: 12116
- DrugBank: DB18016
- ChemSpider: 115007150
- UNII: AY4A8WD6JS
- KEGG: D13344
- ChEMBL: ChEMBL5075255
- PDB ligand: 85K (PDBe, RCSB PDB)

Chemical and physical data
- Formula: C_{23}H_{18}ClFN_{6}O_{2}
- Molar mass: 464.89 g·mol^{−1}
- 3D model (JSmol): Interactive image
- SMILES: CN1C(=C(C=N1)C2=CC3=C(C=C2)C(=O)NN=C3CN)C4=C(C(=CC(=C4F)Cl)OC5CC5)C#N
- InChI: InChI=InChI=1S/C23H18ClFN6O2/c1-31-22(20-15(8-26)19(33-12-3-4-12)7-17(24)21(20)25)16(10-28-31)11-2-5-13-14(6-11)18(9-27)29-30-23(13)32/h2,5-7,10,12H,3-4,9,27H2,1H3,(H,30,32); Key:BZKIOORWZAXIBA-UHFFFAOYSA-N

Navlimetostat is an investigational new drug that is being evaluated by Mirati Therapeutics abd Bristol-Myers Squibb for the treatment of adenocarcinoma. It is a PRMT5 protein inhibitor.
