= Glutaconyl-CoA decarboxylase =

glutaconyl-CoA decarboxylase

Identifiers
- EC no.: 7.2.4.5
- CAS no.: 84399-93-9

Databases
- IntEnz: IntEnz view
- BRENDA: BRENDA entry
- ExPASy: NiceZyme view
- KEGG: KEGG entry
- MetaCyc: metabolic pathway
- PRIAM: profile
- PDB structures: RCSB PDB PDBe PDBsum
- Gene Ontology: AmiGO / QuickGO
Search
- PMC: articles
- PubMed: articles
- NCBI: proteins

In enzymology, a glutaconyl-CoA decarboxylase (EC 7.2.4.5) is an enzyme that catalyzes the chemical reaction

(2E)-glutaconyl-CoA + H^{+} + Na^{+}(in) $\rightleftharpoons$ (2E)-butenoyl-CoA + CO_{2} + Na^{+}(out)

Hence, this enzyme has one substrate, (2E)-glutaconyl-CoA, and two products, (2E)-butenoyl-CoA and CO_{2}. During the process, a sodium ion is transported across the membrane. Previously, this enzyme was classified as EC 4.1.1.70.

This enzyme belongs to the family of lyases, specifically the carboxy-lyases, which cleave carbon-carbon bonds. The systematic name of this enzyme class is 4-carboxybut-2-enoyl-CoA carboxy-lyase (but-2-enoyl-CoA-forming). Other names in common use include glutaconyl coenzyme A decarboxylase, pent-2-enoyl-CoA carboxy-lyase, and 4-carboxybut-2-enoyl-CoA carboxy-lyase. This enzyme participates in benzoate degradation via coa ligation and butanoate metabolism.

As a decarboxylase, the enzyme requires biotin for its function.

== Structural studies ==
As of mid-2024, five structures have been solved for this class of enzymes, with the PDB accession codes 1PIX, 3GF3, 3GF7, 3GLM and 3GMA.
