= Protein arginine methyltransferase 5 =

Protein-coding gene in the species Homo sapiens

PRMT5
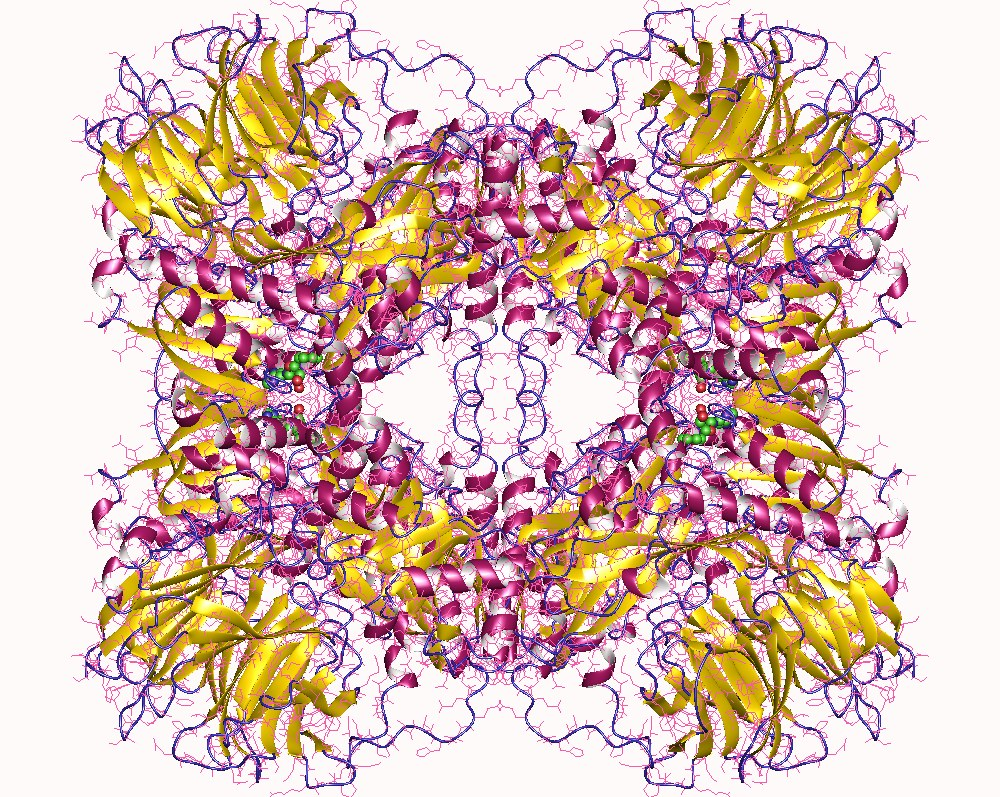

Identifiers
- Aliases: PRMT5, HRMT1L5, IBP72, JBP1, SKB1, SKB1Hs, Protein arginine methyltransferase 5, HSL7
- External IDs: OMIM: 604045; MGI: 1351645; GeneCards: PRMT5
Available structures
PDB	Ortholog search: PDBe RCSB
PDB	List of PDB id codes 4GQB, 4X60, 4X61, 4X63, 5EML, 5FA5, 5EMJ, 5EMK, 5EMM, 5C9Z
Enzyme activity
EC #	BRENDA	ExPASy	KEGG	MetaCyc
2.1.1.320	↗	↗	↗	↗
2.1.1.321	↗	↗	↗	↗

Gene location (Human)
Chr.	Chromosome 14 (human)
Band	14q11.2	Start	22,920,525 bp
Band	14q11.2	End	22,929,408 bp

Gene location (Mouse)
Chr.	Chromosome 14 (mouse)
Band	14|14 C2	Start	54,744,644 bp
Band	14|14 C2	End	54,754,982 bp
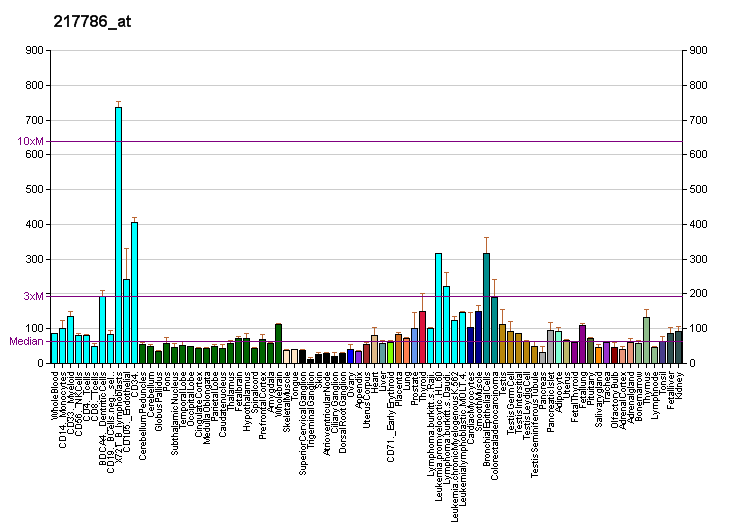
RNA expression pattern
Bgee	Human / Mouse (ortholog); Top expressed in: ventricular zone; amniotic fluid; ganglionic eminence; gonad; right uterine tube; left ovary; right ovary; gastrocnemius muscle; mucosa of transverse colon; islet of Langerhans / Top expressed in: tail of embryo; epiblast; yolk sac; maxillary prominence; mandibular prominence; genital tubercle; otic vesicle; somite; primitive streak; ventricular zone; More reference expression data
BioGPS	More reference expression data
Gene ontology
Molecular function	methyltransferase activity; transferase activity; histone methyltransferase activity (H4-R3 specific); transcription corepressor activity; methyl-CpG binding; core promoter sequence-specific DNA binding; protein binding; protein heterodimerization activity; ribonucleoprotein complex binding; histone-arginine N-methyltransferase activity; protein-arginine N-methyltransferase activity; protein-arginine omega-N symmetric methyltransferase activity; identical protein binding; protein-containing complex binding; E-box binding
Cellular component	cytoplasm; cytosol; Golgi apparatus; nucleoplasm; methylosome; nucleus; histone methyltransferase complex; protein-containing complex
Biological process	regulation of mitotic nuclear division; positive regulation of oligodendrocyte differentiation; regulation of transcription, DNA-templated; histone H4-R3 methylation; rhythmic process; DNA-templated transcription, termination; negative regulation of cell differentiation; peptidyl-arginine N-methylation; endothelial cell activation; circadian regulation of gene expression; transcription, DNA-templated; spliceosomal snRNP assembly; liver regeneration; methylation; peptidyl-arginine methylation; regulation of ERK1 and ERK2 cascade; regulation of DNA methylation; cell population proliferation; Golgi ribbon formation; protein methylation; negative regulation of nucleic acid-templated transcription; positive regulation of adenylate cyclase-inhibiting dopamine receptor signaling pathway; regulation of signal transduction by p53 class mediator; peptidyl-arginine methylation, to symmetrical-dimethyl arginine; chromatin organization; histone arginine methylation
Sources:Amigo / QuickGO
Orthologs
Databases	NCBI: entry; OMA: entry
Species	Human	Mouse
Entrez	10419	27374
Ensembl	ENSG00000100462	ENSMUSG00000023110
UniProt	O14744	Q8CIG8
RefSeq (mRNA)	NM_001039619; NM_001282953; NM_001282954; NM_001282955; NM_001282956 NM_006109	NM_013768; NM_001313906; NM_001313907
RefSeq (protein)	NP_001034708; NP_001269882; NP_001269883; NP_001269884; NP_001269885 NP_006100	NP_001300835; NP_001300836; NP_038796
Location (UCSC)	Chr 14: 22.92 – 22.93 Mb	Chr 14: 54.74 – 54.75 Mb
PubMed search
- Wikidata
View/Edit Human	View/Edit Mouse

Protein arginine N-methyltransferase 5 is an enzyme that in humans is encoded by the PRMT5 gene. PRMT5 symmetrically methylates H2AR3, H4R3, H3R2, and H3R8 in vivo, all of which are linked to a range of transcriptional regulatory events.

PRMT5 is a highly conserved arginine methyltransferase that translocated from the cytoplasm to the nucleus at embryonic day ~E8.5, and during preimplantation development at the ~4-cell stage.

== Inhibitors ==
Anvumetostat (AMG-193) and Navlimetostat (MRTX-1719) are PRMT5 selective inhibitors that is being developed for the treatment of adenocarcinoma.

== Interactions ==
Protein arginine methyltransferase 5 has been shown to interact with:

- CLNS1A,
- Janus kinase 2,
- SNRPD3,
- SUPT5H,
- MEP50,
- RIOK1,
- COPR5.

PRMT5 has been shown to interact with CLNS1A, RIOK1 and COPR5 through an interface created by a shallow groove located on the TIM barrel domain of PRMT5 and the consensus sequence GQF[D/E]DA[E/D] located in the terminal regions of the adaptor proteins. The characterisation of the interactions occurring in the binding groove between PRMT5 and peptides derived from the adaptor proteins lead to development of protein-protein interaction (PPI) inhibitors, modulating binding between PRMT5 and the adaptor proteins. Furthermore, Asberry and co-workers synthesised the first-in-class small molecule inhibitor of the PPI between PRMT5 and MEP50. The PPI inhibitors complement a plethora of compounds directly suppressing the enzymatic activity of PRMT5.
