= Tripeptide aminopeptidase =

Class of enzymes

Identifiers
- EC no.: 3.4.11.4
- CAS no.: 9056-26-2

Databases
- IntEnz: IntEnz view
- BRENDA: BRENDA entry
- ExPASy: NiceZyme view
- KEGG: KEGG entry
- MetaCyc: metabolic pathway
- PRIAM: profile
- PDB structures: RCSB PDB PDBe PDBsum
Search
- PMC: articles
- PubMed: articles
- NCBI: proteins

Tripeptide aminopeptidase (EC 3.4.11.4, tripeptidase, aminotripeptidase, aminoexotripeptidase, lymphopeptidase, imidoendopeptidase, peptidase B, alanine-phenylalanine-proline arylamidase, peptidase T) is an enzyme. This enzyme catalyses the following chemical reaction:

Release of the N-terminal residue from a tripeptide

This is a zinc enzyme, widely distributed in mammalian tissues.
