= Non-homologous isofunctional enzymes =

Evolutionarily unrelated enzymes that catalyze the same chemical reaction

Non-homologous isofunctional enzymes (NISEs) refer to any set of evolutionarily unrelated enzymes that catalyze the same chemical reaction. Enzymes that catalyze the same reaction are sometimes referred to as analogous as opposed to homologous, though it is more appropriate to refer to them as "non-homologous" and "isofunctional", hence the acronym NISE. Such enzymes all serve the same end function but do so in different organisms, having evolved apparently independently without detectable similarity in primary and possibly tertiary structures, making them examples of convergent evolution.

== Background ==
Enzymes are classified based on recommendations from the Nomenclature Committee of the International Union of Biochemistry and Molecular Biology and are given an enzyme commission number, commonly referred to as an EC number. Each distinct enzymatic activity is given a recommended name and EC number. To be classified as a distinct enzyme, "direct experimental evidence is required that the proposed enzyme actually catalyses the reaction claimed".

== History ==
Examples of unrelated enzymes with similar functions were noted as early as 1943 by Warburg and Christian, who discovered two different forms of fructose-bisphosphate aldolase, one occurring in yeast cells and the other occurring in rabbit muscle. In 1998, an article by Mariana Omelchenko et al. titled "Analogous Enzymes: Independent Inventions in Enzyme Evolution" identified 105 EC numbers containing two or more proteins without detectable sequence similarity to each other. Of these 105 EC numbers, 34 EC nodes with distinct structural folds were located, helping to show independent evolutionary origins. In 2010, another article by Mariana Omelchenko et al. titled "Non-homologous isofunctional enzymes: A systematic analysis of alternative solutions in enzyme evolution" listed the discovery of 185 distinct EC nodes with only 74 from the original 1998 list, summarizing their twelve-year search and concluding that NISEs may exist for up to 10 percent of all biochemical reactions.

== Origins ==
A possible mechanism for the formation and evolution of these enzymes is recruitment of existing enzymes that gain new functions by a modification in substrate specificity (specifically at or near the active site) or modification of the existing catalytic mechanism.

== Importance ==
Discovery of NISEs can reveal new mechanisms for enzyme catalysis and specific information about biochemical pathways that can be particularly important for drug development.

== Examples ==
A popular example of NISEs is the superoxide dismutase family of enzymes which contains three distinct forms (EC 1.15.1.1)

1. Fe,Mn superoxide dismutase
2. Cu,Zn superoxide dismutase
3. Nickel superoxide dismutase

CuZn superoxide dismutase (SOD1) was the first to be discovered and is a homodimer containing copper and zinc, often found in intracellular cytoplasmic spaces. FeMn (SOD2) is a tetramer produced by a leader peptide targeting the manganese-containing enzyme only in mitochondrial spaces. Nickel superoxide dismutase (SOD3) is the most recently characterized and exists only in extracellular spaces.

Another popular example of NISEs is the cellulase family of enzymes, particularly cellulose 1,4-beta-cellobiosidase, also consisting of three distinct forms possessing endonuclease activity (EC 3.2.1.91):

1. GH-48
2. GH-7
3. GH-6

Two classes exist. One class attacks the reducing end of cellulose and the other attacks the non-reducing end. GH-6 family enzymes attack the non-reducing end of cellulose while GH-7 family enzymes attack the reducing end. GH-48 family enzymes are bacterial family enzymes only and attack the reducing end of cellulose.

== Mechanisms of discovery ==
Typical genome search methods such as BLAST and the hidden Markov model are used to find discrepancies and similarities in genomes.
