= P-type Na+ transporter =

Class of enzymes

P-type Na^{+} transporter

Identifiers
- EC no.: 7.2.2.3

Databases
- IntEnz: IntEnz view
- BRENDA: BRENDA entry
- ExPASy: NiceZyme view
- KEGG: KEGG entry
- MetaCyc: metabolic pathway
- PRIAM: profile
- PDB structures: RCSB PDB PDBe PDBsum
- Gene Ontology: AmiGO / QuickGO
Search
- PMC: articles
- PubMed: articles
- NCBI: proteins

In enzymology, a P-type Na^{+} transporter (EC 7.2.2.3) is an enzyme that catalyzes the chemical reaction

ATP + H_{2}O + Na^{+}_{[side 1]} $\rightleftharpoons$ ADP + phosphate + Na^{+}_{[side 2]}

The 3 substrates of this enzyme are ATP, H_{2}O, and Na^{+}, whereas its 3 products are ADP, phosphate, and Na^{+}.

This enzyme belongs to the family of translocases, specifically those catalysing the translocation of inorganic cations and their chelates. The systematic name of this enzyme class is ATP phosphohydrolase (P-type, Na^{+}-exporting).
