= MTAP =

Enzymes responsible for polyamine metabolism

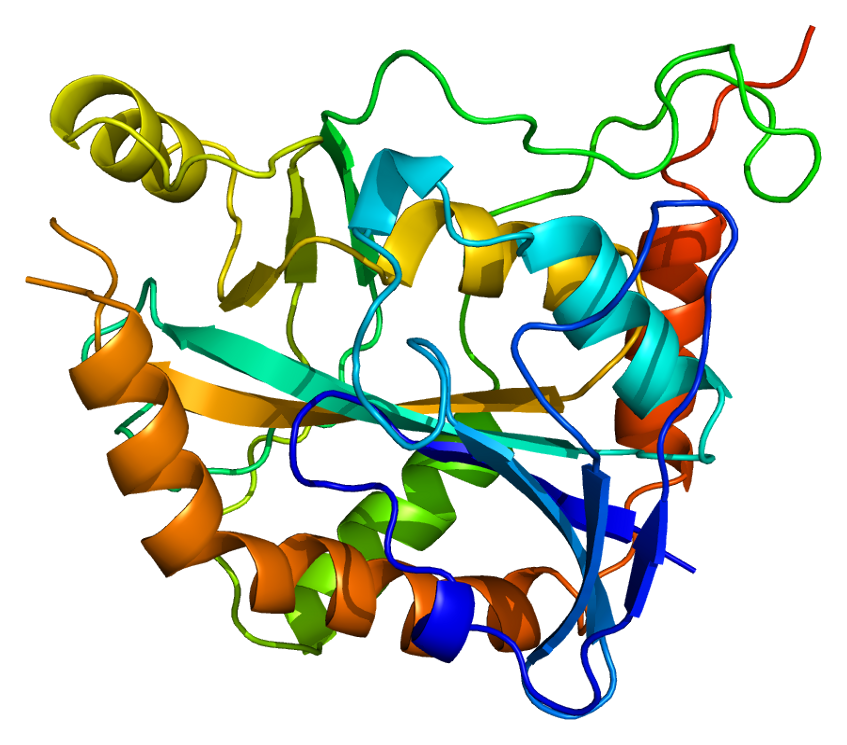

Identifiers
- Aliases: MTAP, BDMF, DMSFH, DMSMFH, HEL-249, LGMBF, MSAP, c86fus, methylthioadenosine phosphorylase
- External IDs: OMIM: 156540; MGI: 1914152; GeneCards: MTAP
Available structures
| PDB | Ortholog search: PDBe RCSB |
| PDB | List of PDB id codes 1SD1, 3OZD, 3OZC, 3LN5, 3OZE, 1SD2, 1CB0, 1CG6, 1K27 |
Enzyme activity
| EC # | BRENDA | ExPASy | KEGG | MetaCyc |
|---|---|---|---|---|
| 2.4.2.28 | ↗ | ↗ | ↗ | ↗ |

Gene location (Human)
| Chr. | Chromosome 9 (human) |
| Band | 9p21.3 | Start | 21,802,636 bp |
| Band | 9p21.3 | End | 21,937,651 bp |

Gene location (Mouse)
| Chr. | Chromosome 4 (mouse) |
| Band | 4|4 C4 | Start | 89,055,359 bp |
| Band | 4|4 C4 | End | 89,099,318 bp |
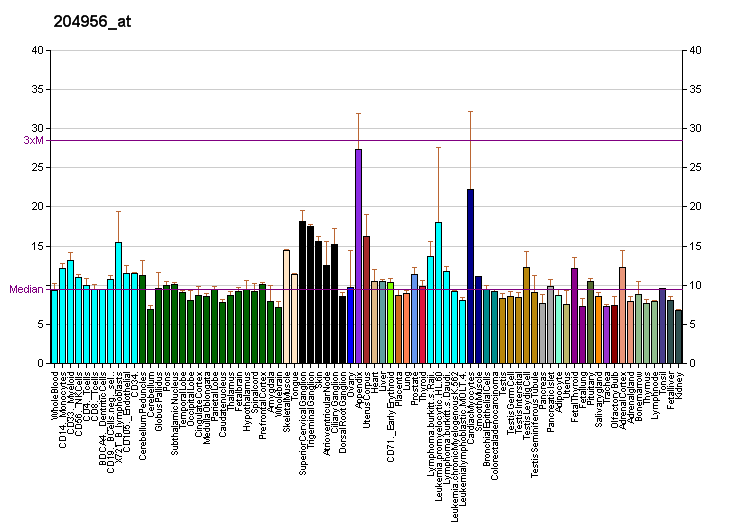

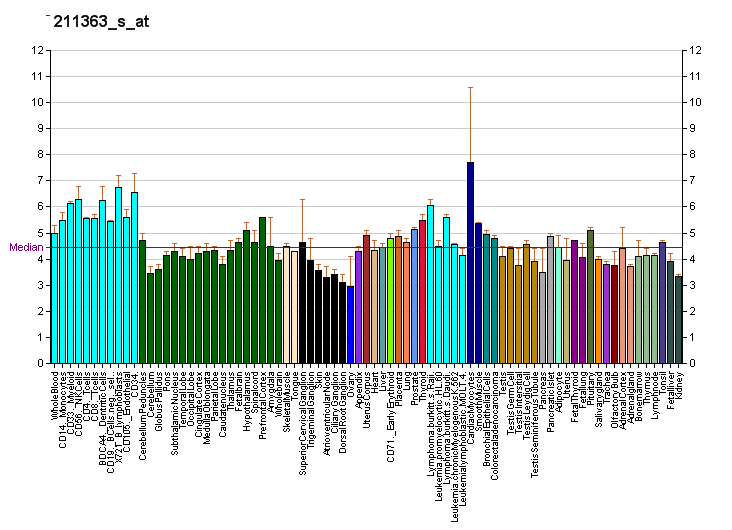

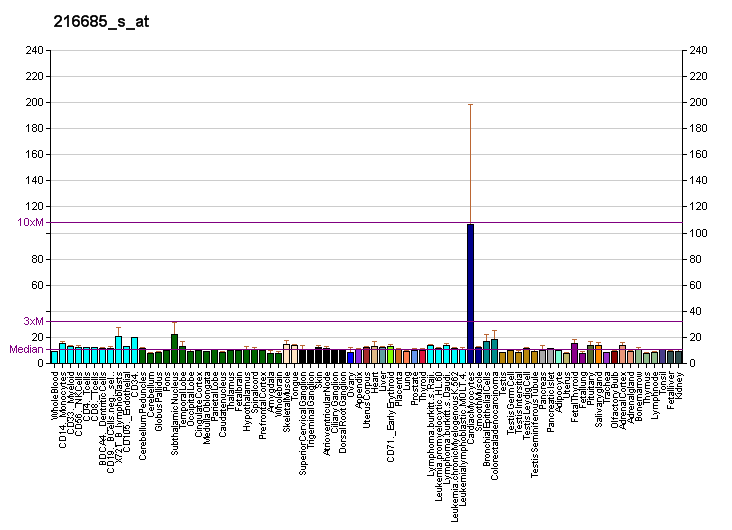
RNA expression pattern
| Bgee | Human / Mouse (ortholog); Top expressed in: Achilles tendon; epithelium of colon; sural nerve; stromal cell of endometrium; islet of Langerhans; rectum; ganglionic eminence; ventricular zone; body of pancreas; gonad / Top expressed in: primitive streak; endothelial cell of lymphatic vessel; condyle; epithelium of lens; facial motor nucleus; fossa; somite; maxillary prominence; mandibular prominence; external carotid artery; More reference expression data |
| BioGPS | More reference expression data |
Gene ontology
| Molecular function | transferase activity; glycosyltransferase activity; 1,4-alpha-oligoglucan phosphorylase activity; catalytic activity; protein binding; pentosyltransferase activity; S-methyl-5-thioadenosine phosphorylase activity |
| Cellular component | extracellular exosome; nucleus; cytosol; cytoplasm |
| Biological process | L-methionine salvage from methylthioadenosine; purine ribonucleoside salvage; nucleoside metabolic process; nicotinamide riboside catabolic process; nucleobase-containing compound metabolic process; interleukin-12-mediated signaling pathway; methylation; response to testosterone |
Sources:Amigo / QuickGO
Orthologs
| Databases | NCBI: entry; OMA: entry |
| Species | Human | Mouse |
| Entrez | 4507 | 66902 |
| Ensembl | ENSG00000099810 | ENSMUSG00000062937 |
| UniProt | Q13126 | Q9CQ65 |
| RefSeq (mRNA) | NM_002451 | NM_024433 |
| RefSeq (protein) | NP_002442 | NP_077753 |
| Location (UCSC) | Chr 9: 21.8 – 21.94 Mb | Chr 4: 89.06 – 89.1 Mb |
| PubMed search |
- Wikidata
| View/Edit Human | View/Edit Mouse |

S-methyl-5-thioadenosine phosphorylase
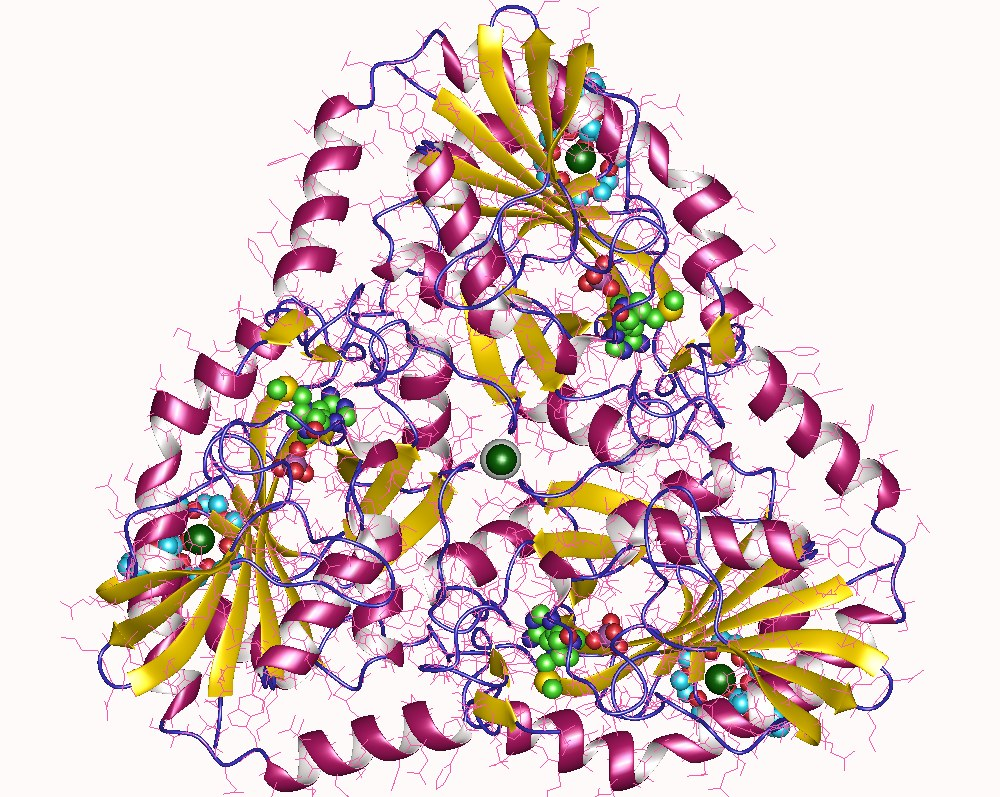
- S-methyl-5'-thioadenosine phosphorylase trimer, Human

Identifiers
- EC no.: 2.4.2.28
- CAS no.: 61970-06-7

Databases
- BRENDA: enzyme data
- ExPASy: NiceZyme view
- KEGG: enzyme entry
- MetaCyc: metabolic pathway
- Rhea: reactions
- PDB structures: RCSB PDB PDBe PDBsum
- Gene Ontology: AmiGO / QuickGO
Search
- PMC: articles
- PubMed: articles
- NCBI: proteins

S-methyl-5'-thioadenosine phosphorylase (MTAP) is an enzyme responsible for polyamine metabolism. In humans, it is encoded by the methylthioadenosine phosphorylase (MTAP) gene on chromosome 9. Multiple alternatively spliced transcript variants have been described for this gene, but their full-length natures remain unknown.

This gene encodes an enzyme that plays a major role in polyamine metabolism and is important for the salvage of both adenine and methionine. It is responsible for the first step in this pathway, where it catalyzes the reversible phosphorylation of MTA to adenine and 5-methylthioribose-1-phosphate. This takes place after MTA is generated from S-adenosylmethionine.

An additional role of MTAP has been found in the protozoan parasite Trypanosoma brucei, which causes African trypanosomiasis (sleeping sickness). The T. brucei MTAP has an unusually broad specificity and can cleave MTA as well as adenosine and deoxyadenosine. The cleavage of deoxyadenosine serves as a protection mechanism to avoid the accumulation of toxic levels of dATP in the parasite (dATP is formed form deoxyadenosine). The cleavage activity has also consequences for drug discovery against African trypanosomiasis. It is important that adenosine analogues developed against the parasite are resistant to cleavage to be effective.

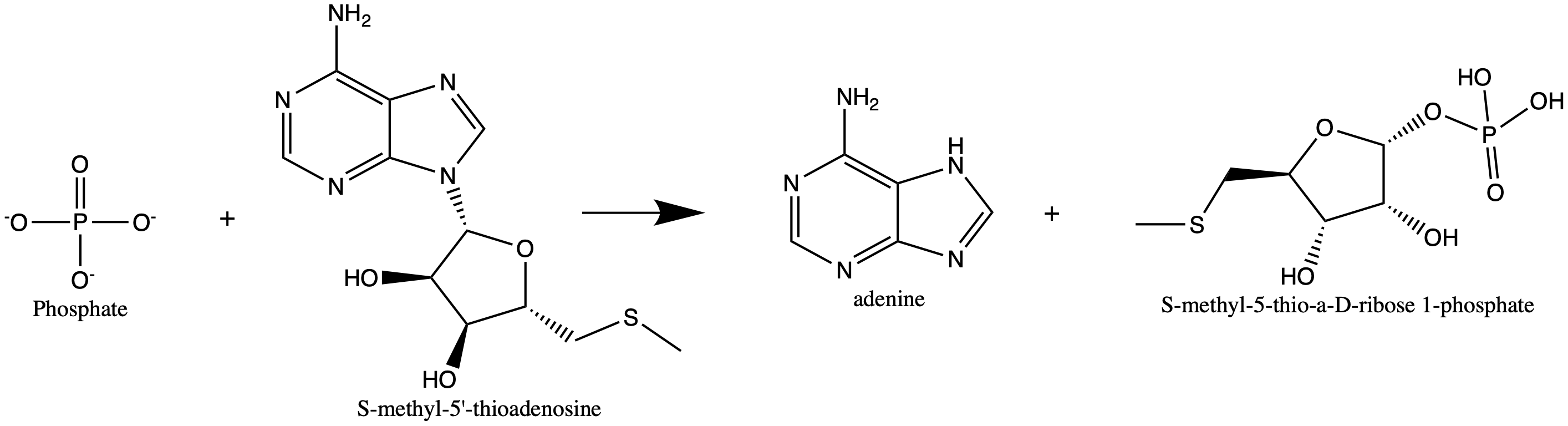
A summary of the reaction that MTAP catalyzes.

MTAP was identified for the first time and characterized likely as a phosphorylase in 1969 by Pegg and Williams-Ashman. The first purification that allowed characterization was by a group in 1986. This purification allowed researchers to investigate why there is the lower expression of MTAP in some types of cancer.

Increased levels of MTA in tumor cells along with lower expression of MTAP. The enzyme is deficient in many cancers because this gene and the tumor-suppressive p16 gene are co-deleted.

== Classification ==
This enzyme belongs to the family of glycosyltransferases, specifically the pentosyltransferases. The systematic name of this enzyme class is S-methyl-5-thioadenosine:phosphate S-methyl-5-thio-alpha-D-ribosyl-transferase. Other names in common use include 5'-methylthioadenosine nucleosidase, 5'-deoxy-5'-methylthioadenosine phosphorylase, MTA phosphorylase, MeSAdo phosphorylase, MeSAdo/Ado phosphorylase, methylthioadenosine phosphorylase, methylthioadenosine nucleoside phosphorylase, 5'-methylthioadenosine:phosphate methylthio-D-ribosyl-transferase, and S-methyl-5-thioadenosine phosphorylase. This enzyme participates in methionine metabolism.

== Gene ==
The MTAP gene location is 9p21.3 which is chromosome 9, p arm, band 2, sub-band1, and sub-sub-band 3. The MTAP gene has seven isomers which are created when mRNA's of the same locus have different transcription start sites. Due to the nature of the MTAP gene and the surrounding genes of chromosome 9, deletion of the genes around p21, and gene p21 are common. Particularly the deletion of the gene p16 in conjunction with the whole or partial deletion of MTAP has been indicated in some cancer types. Genes p15 and p16 of chromosome nine are closely linked to the MTAP gene, because of this, MTAP is commonly cross-deleted. This deletion is found in many cancerous tissues.

== Structure ==
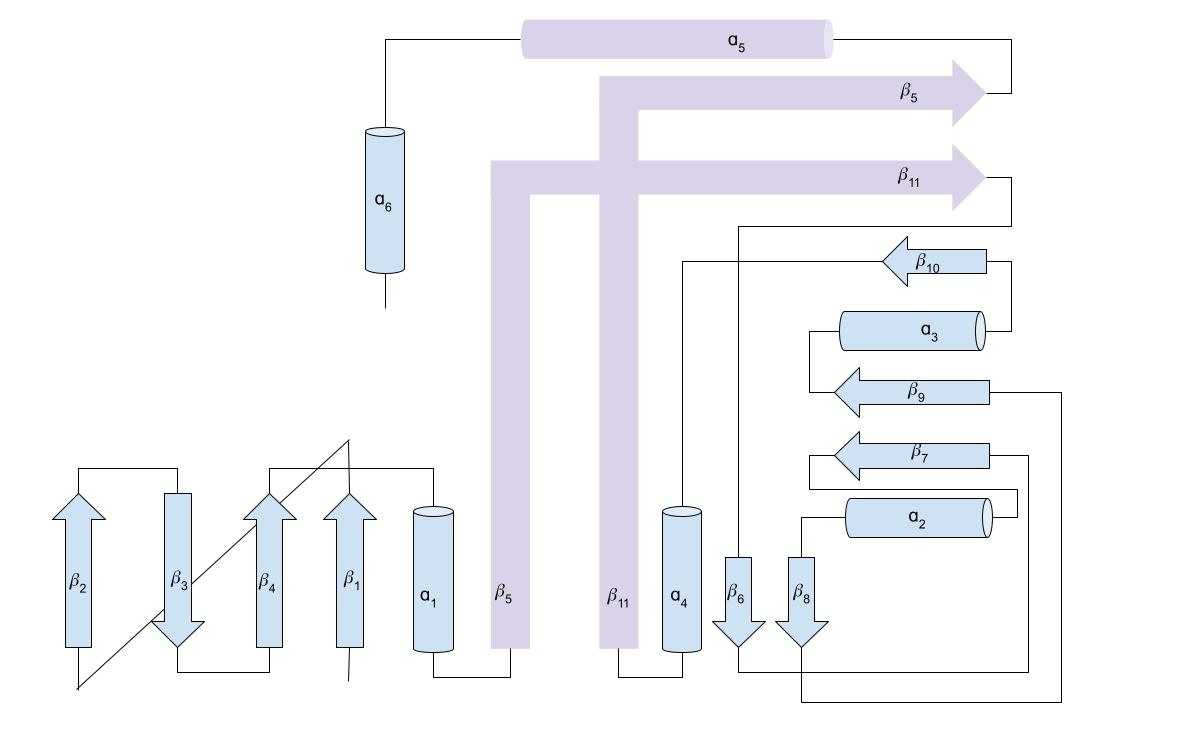
MTAP Subunit Secondary Structure with active site indicated in purple.

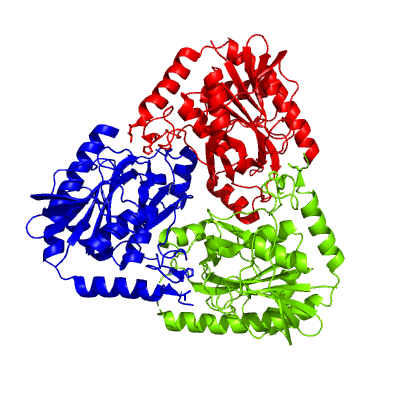
MTAP quaternary structure with different subunits indicated by different colors (red, blue, and green). Generated using PyMol.

MTAP is a trimer enzyme that shares a similar structure and functions with mammalian purine nucleoside phosphorylases (PNPs) which are also trimeric enzymes. MTAP's subunits are identical in structure and composed of 283 amino acid residues that form to the size of about 32 kDa each. The main structure of an MTAP subunit consists of eleven beta-sheets with six alpha-helices intermixed. The active site of the enzyme is made up of beta-sheets five and 11, as well as alpha-helix 5, and four separate residue loop structures. Within MTAP, helix six is a 12-residue C-terminal helix that arranges for the leucine residue 279 of one subunit to be a part of the active site of another subunit. The active site of each subunit includes two residues (His137 and Leu279) from a neighboring subunit, relying on the interactions between the subunits for proper enzymatic activity. MTAP contains an active site with three regions that correspond to a base, methylthioribose, and sulfate/phosphate binding site.

== Function ==
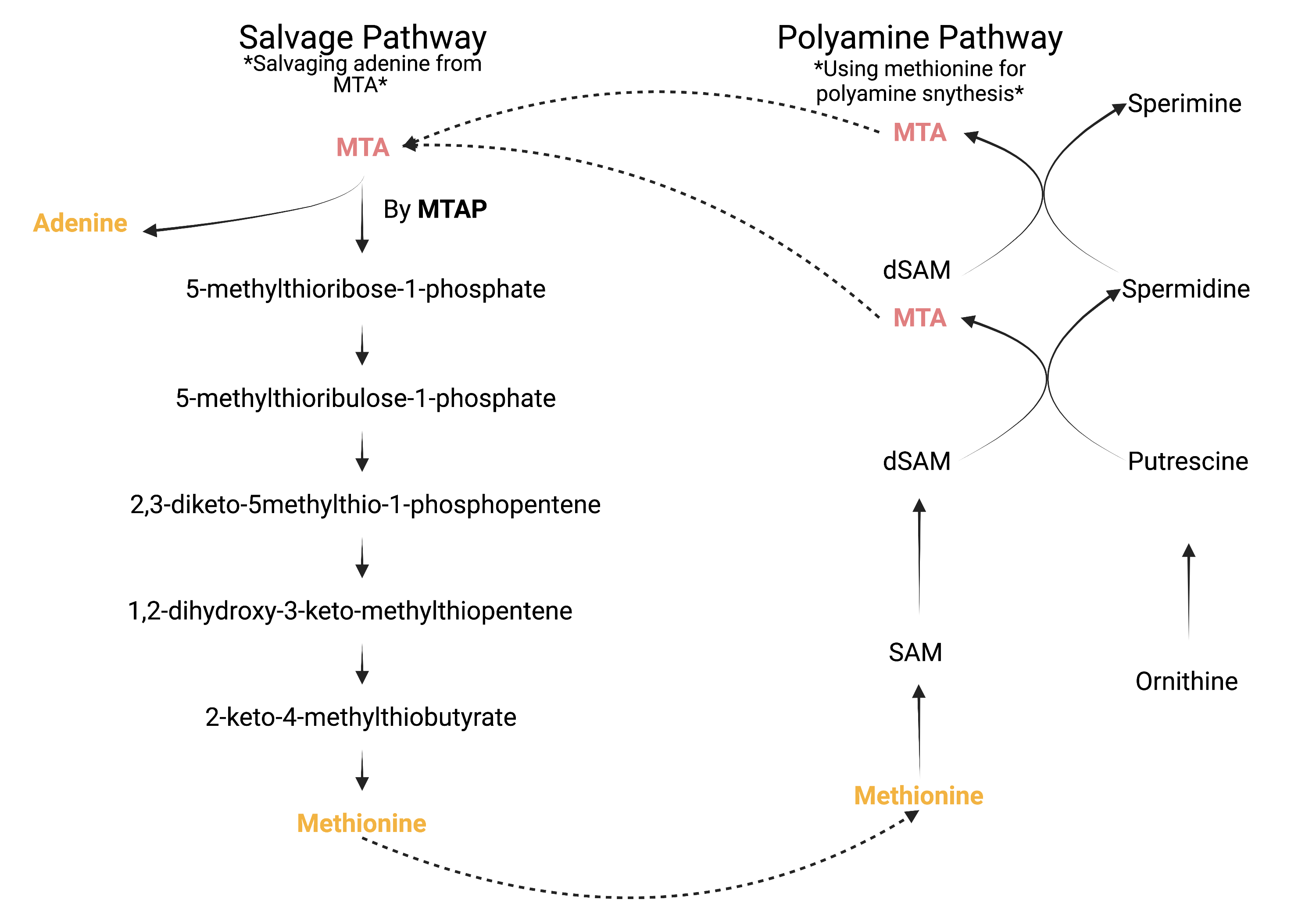
Methionine Salvage Pathway and Polyamine Pathways of the MTAP enzyme.

S-methyl-5'-thioadenosine phosphorylase, MTAP, primarily functions to salvage adenine and methionine from molecule methylthioadenosine (MTA), a byproduct of the polyamine pathway. MTAP is a phosphorylase, which is an enzyme that catalyzes the addition of an inorganic phosphate to another molecule. MTAP is responsible for the cleaving of its substrate, MTA, into adenine and 5-methylthioribose-1-phosphate by the addition of the inorganic phosphate to the 1-prime carbon of the ribose sugar unit MTA. The 5-methylthioribose-1-phosphate is then cycled into the salvage pathway and metabolized into methionine. The MTAP enzyme is responsible for nearly all the adenine synthesis in the human body. Adenine is one of the purine bases of nucleic acids, which build both DNA and RNA. Through the recovery of adenine, MTAP plays an indirect role in the synthesis of DNA and RNA.

== Cancer ==
There is a connection between tumor growth, cancer developments, and the MTAP enzyme. Research studies show that tumor cells have lower expression of MTAP enzymes and a higher concentration of the MTA molecule. This trend can be easily understood through the polyamine pathway where MTAP functions to cleave its substrate MTA. In healthy cells, the molecule MTA is believed to have tumor suppressing properties and regulate cell proliferation. However, when MTA levels were recorded above optimal working conditions, these MTA molecules appeared to have an inverse relation, promoting tumor growth and significantly increasing the proliferation of tumor cells. These increased levels of MTA in tumor cells is in direct correlation to a down regulation or complete deletion of the gene encoding the MTAP enzyme.
