= Glutaconyl-CoA =

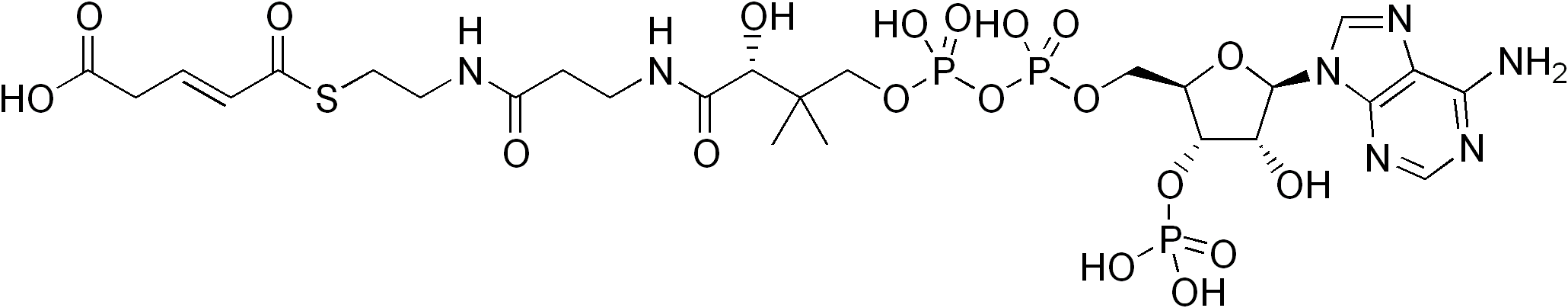

Names
- IUPAC name (3E)-5-[(2-{{#parsoidfragment:0}}{3-[(2R)-4-{[1,3-Dihydroxy-1,3-dioxo-3-(3′-O-phosphonoadenosin-5′-O-yl)-1λ^{5},3λ^{5}-diphosphoxan-1-yl]oxy}-3,3-dimethylbutanamido]propanamido}ethyl)sulfanyl]-5-oxopent-3-enoic acid
- Systematic IUPAC name (9R,20E)-1-[(2R,3S,4R,5R)-5-(6-Amino-9H-purin-9-yl)-4-hydroxy-3-(phosphonooxy)oxolan-2-yl]-3,5,9-trihydroxy-8,8-dimethyl-3,5,10,14,19-pentaoxo-2,4,6-trioxa-18-thia-11,15-diaza-3λ^{5},5λ^{5}-diphosphatricos-20-en-23-oic acid
- Other names Glutaconyl-coenzyme A

Identifiers
| CAS Number | 6712-05-6 |
| 3D model (JSmol) | Interactive image |
| ChemSpider | 7822023 |
| MeSH | glutaconyl-coenzyme+A |
| PubChem CID | 9543050 |
| UNII | 281DQF1ZC5 |
- InChI: InChI=1S/C26H40N7O19P3S/c1-26(2,21(39)24(40)29-7-6-15(34)28-8-9-56-17(37)5-3-4-16(35)36)11-49-55(46,47)52-54(44,45)48-10-14-20(51-53(41,42)43)19(38)25(50-14)33-13-32-18-22(27)30-12-31-23(18)33/h3,5,12-14,19-21,25,38-39H,4,6-11H2,1-2H3,(H,28,34)(H,29,40)(H,35,36)(H,44,45)(H,46,47)(H2,27,30,31)(H2,41,42,43)/b5-3+/t14-,19-,20-,21+,25-/m1/s1 Key: URTLOTISFJPPOU-DEGQQWIJSA-N; InChI=1/C26H40N7O19P3S/c1-26(2,21(39)24(40)29-7-6-15(34)28-8-9-56-17(37)5-3-4-16(35)36)11-49-55(46,47)52-54(44,45)48-10-14-20(51-53(41,42)43)19(38)25(50-14)33-13-32-18-22(27)30-12-31-23(18)33/h3,5,12-14,19-21,25,38-39H,4,6-11H2,1-2H3,(H,28,34)(H,29,40)(H,35,36)(H,44,45)(H,46,47)(H2,27,30,31)(H2,41,42,43)/b5-3+/t14-,19-,20-,21+,25-/m1/s1 Key: URTLOTISFJPPOU-DEGQQWIJBS
- SMILES: O=C(O)C/C=C/C(=O)SCCNC(=O)CCNC(=O)[C@H](O)C(C)(C)COP(=O)(O)OP(=O)(O)OC[C@H]3O[C@@H](n2cnc1c(ncnc12)N)[C@H](O)[C@@H]3OP(=O)(O)O

Properties
| Chemical formula | C_{26}H_{40}N_{7}O_{19}P_{3}S |
| Molar mass | 879.62 g/mol |
- Except where otherwise noted, data are given for materials in their standard state (at 25 °C [77 °F], 100 kPa). verify (what is ?) Infobox references

Glutaconyl-CoA is an intermediate in the metabolism of lysine. It is an organic compound containing a coenzyme substructure, which classifies it as a fatty ester lipid molecule. Being a lipid makes the molecule hydrophobic, which makes it insoluble in water. The molecule has a molecular formula of C_{26}H_{40}N_{7}O_{19}P_{3}S, and a molecular weight 879.62 grams per mole.

Glutaconyl-CoA is postulated to be the main toxin in glutaric aciduria type 1. In certain fermentative bacteria, glutaconyl-CoA decarboxylation is catalyzed by a Na^{+}-dependent decarboxylase (EC 7.2.4.5) and is coupled with Na^{+} ion translocation, which creates a sodium-motive force as an alternate energy source for these organisms.

== See also ==
- Glutaconate CoA-transferase
- Glutaconyl-CoA decarboxylase
