= WD repeat-containing protein 77 =

Protein found in humans

WDR77

Identifiers
- Aliases: WDR77, MEP-50, MEP50, Nbla10071, p44, p44/Mep50, HKMT1069, WD repeat domain 77
- External IDs: OMIM: 611734; MGI: 1917715; GeneCards: WDR77
Available structures
PDB	Ortholog search: PDBe RCSB
PDB	List of PDB id codes 4GQB, 4X60, 4X61, 4X63, 5EMJ, 5EML, 5EMM, 5FA5, 5EMK, 5C9Z

Gene location (Human)
Chr.	Chromosome 1 (human)
Band	1p13.2	Start	111,439,890 bp
Band	1p13.2	End	111,449,256 bp

Gene location (Mouse)
Chr.	Chromosome 3 (mouse)
Band	3|3 F2.2	Start	105,866,685 bp
Band	3|3 F2.2	End	105,877,353 bp
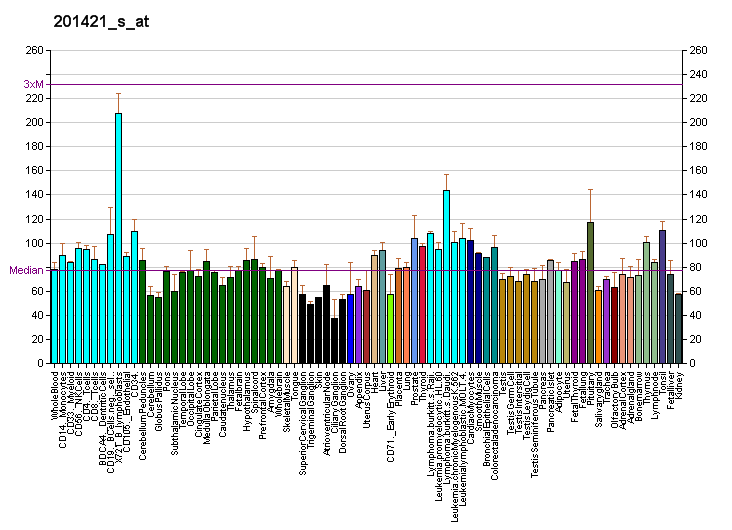

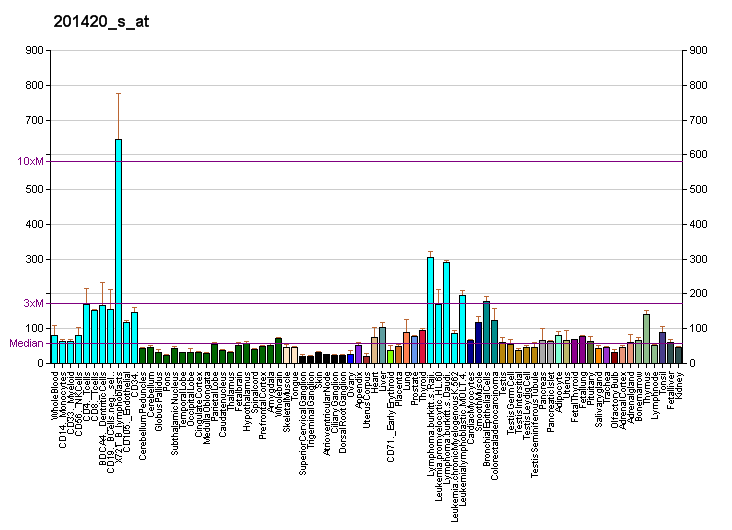
RNA expression pattern
Bgee	Human / Mouse (ortholog); Top expressed in: right uterine tube; apex of heart; gastrocnemius muscle; right adrenal cortex; muscle of thigh; mucosa of esophagus; body of stomach; left ventricle; left adrenal gland; rectum / Top expressed in: primitive streak; epiblast; somite; tail of embryo; abdominal wall; endocardial cushion; Gonadal ridge; embryo; embryo; mandibular prominence; More reference expression data
BioGPS	More reference expression data
Gene ontology
Molecular function	methyl-CpG binding; protein binding; nuclear receptor coactivator activity; protein-arginine N-methyltransferase activity
Cellular component	cytoplasm; cytosol; Golgi apparatus; methylosome; nucleoplasm; nucleus
Biological process	regulation of transcription by RNA polymerase II; secretory columnal luminar epithelial cell differentiation involved in prostate glandular acinus development; negative regulation of epithelial cell proliferation involved in prostate gland development; positive regulation of cell population proliferation; negative regulation of cell population proliferation; peptidyl-arginine N-methylation; positive regulation of nucleic acid-templated transcription; spliceosomal snRNP assembly
Sources:Amigo / QuickGO
Orthologs
Databases	NCBI: entry; OMA: entry
Species	Human	Mouse
Entrez	79084	70465
Ensembl	ENSG00000116455	ENSMUSG00000000561
UniProt	Q9BQA1	Q99J09
RefSeq (mRNA)	NM_024102; NM_001317062; NM_001317063; NM_001317064	NM_027432
RefSeq (protein)	NP_001303991; NP_001303992; NP_001303993; NP_077007	NP_081708
Location (UCSC)	Chr 1: 111.44 – 111.45 Mb	Chr 3: 105.87 – 105.88 Mb
PubMed search
- Wikidata
View/Edit Human	View/Edit Mouse

Methylosome protein 50 is a protein that in humans is encoded by the WDR77 gene.

== Interactions ==
WD repeat-containing protein 77 has been shown to interact with CTDP1 and Protein arginine methyltransferase 5.
