= SNRPD3 =

Protein-coding gene in the species Homo sapiens

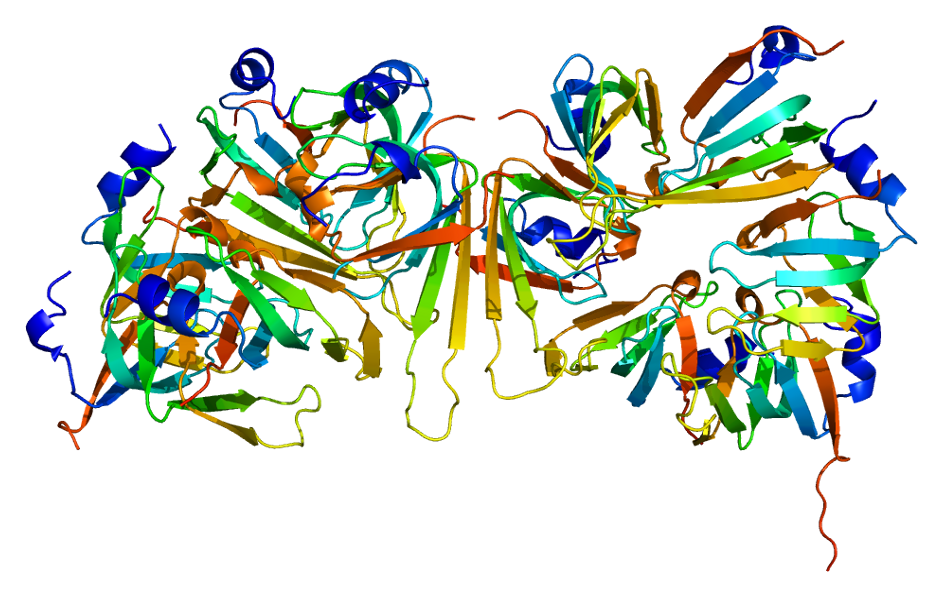

Identifiers
- Aliases: SNRPD3, SMD3, Sm-D3, small nuclear ribonucleoprotein D3 polypeptide
- External IDs: OMIM: 601062; MGI: 1914582; GeneCards: SNRPD3
Available structures
PDB	Ortholog search: PDBe RCSB
PDB	List of PDB id codes 1D3B, 3CW1, 3PGW, 3VRI, 4PJO, 4WZJ, 3JCR

Gene location (Human)
Chr.	Chromosome 22 (human)
Band	22q11.23	Start	24,555,958 bp
Band	22q11.23	End	24,582,052 bp

Gene location (Mouse)
Chr.	Chromosome 10 (mouse)
Band	10|10 C1	Start	75,353,385 bp
Band	10|10 C1	End	75,373,215 bp
RNA expression pattern
Bgee	Human / Mouse (ortholog); Top expressed in: ganglionic eminence; islet of Langerhans; ventricular zone; white blood cell; monocyte; appendix; muscle of thigh; granulocyte; olfactory zone of nasal mucosa; duodenum / Top expressed in: abdominal wall; otic placode; ventricular zone; somite; migratory enteric neural crest cell; mandibular prominence; maxillary prominence; endocardial cushion; dermis; hand; More reference expression data
BioGPS	n/a
Gene ontology
Molecular function	histone pre-mRNA DCP binding; U2 snRNA binding; protein binding; enzyme binding; U7 snRNA binding; telomerase RNA binding; U1 snRNP binding; RNA binding
Cellular component	SMN-Sm protein complex; cytosol; prespliceosome; catalytic step 2 spliceosome; spliceosomal tri-snRNP complex; U5 snRNP; U12-type spliceosomal complex; U2 snRNP; nucleoplasm; methylosome; U7 snRNP; precatalytic spliceosome; small nuclear ribonucleoprotein complex; pICln-Sm protein complex; telomerase holoenzyme complex; spliceosomal complex; commitment complex; U4 snRNP; extracellular exosome; nucleus; U1 snRNP; cytoplasm; nuclear body; U4/U6 x U5 tri-snRNP complex; U2-type precatalytic spliceosome; U2-type catalytic step 2 spliceosome
Biological process	mRNA splicing, via spliceosome; termination of RNA polymerase II transcription; RNA processing; mRNA processing; spliceosomal complex assembly; RNA splicing; histone mRNA metabolic process; protein methylation; import into nucleus; spliceosomal snRNP assembly
Sources:Amigo / QuickGO
Orthologs
Databases	NCBI: entry; OMA: entry
Species	Human	Mouse
Entrez	6634	67332
Ensembl	ENSG00000100028	ENSMUSG00000020180
UniProt	P62318	P62320
RefSeq (mRNA)	NM_001278656; NM_004175	NM_026095
RefSeq (protein)	NP_001265585; NP_004166	NP_080371
Location (UCSC)	Chr 22: 24.56 – 24.58 Mb	Chr 10: 75.35 – 75.37 Mb
PubMed search
- Wikidata
View/Edit Human	View/Edit Mouse

Small nuclear ribonucleoprotein Sm D3 is a protein that in humans is encoded by the SNRPD3 gene.

== Function ==
The protein encoded by this gene belongs to the small nuclear ribonucleoprotein core protein family. It is required for pre-mRNA splicing and small nuclear ribonucleoprotein biogenesis.

== Interactions ==
SNRPD3 has been shown to interact with:

- CDC5L,
- CLNS1A,
- DDX20, and
- Protein arginine methyltransferase 5.
