= Menaquinol oxidase (H+-transporting) =

Menaquinol oxidase (H^{+}-transporting)

Identifiers
- EC no.: 7.1.1.5

Databases
- IntEnz: IntEnz view
- BRENDA: BRENDA entry
- ExPASy: NiceZyme view
- KEGG: KEGG entry
- MetaCyc: metabolic pathway
- PRIAM: profile
- PDB structures: RCSB PDB PDBe PDBsum
Search
- PMC: articles
- PubMed: articles
- NCBI: proteins

Menaquinol oxidase (H^{+}-transporting) (EC 7.1.1.5, cytochrome aa3-600 oxidase) is an enzyme with systematic name menaquinol:O2 oxidoreductase (H+-transporting). This enzyme catalyses the following chemical reaction

2 menaquinol + O_{2} $\rightleftharpoons$ 2 menaquinone + 2 H_{2}O

Cytochrome aa3-600, one of the respiratory oxidases from Bacillus subtilis, is a member of the heme-copper family of oxygen reductases.
