= Carboxybiotin decarboxylase =

Identifiers
- EC no.: 7.2.4.1

Databases
- IntEnz: IntEnz view
- BRENDA: BRENDA entry
- ExPASy: NiceZyme view
- KEGG: KEGG entry
- MetaCyc: metabolic pathway
- PRIAM: profile
- PDB structures: RCSB PDB PDBe PDBsum
Search
- PMC: articles
- PubMed: articles
- NCBI: proteins

Carboxybiotin decarboxylase (EC 7.2.4.1, MadB, carboxybiotin protein decarboxylase) is an enzyme with systematic name carboxybiotinyl-(protein) carboxy-lyase. This enzyme catalyses the following chemical reaction

a carboxybiotinyl-[protein] + n Na^{+}_{in} + H^{+}_{out} $\rightleftharpoons$ CO_{2} + a biotinyl-[protein] + n Na^{+}_{out} (n = 1--2)

This enzyme is an integral membrane protein MadB from the anaerobic bacterium Malonomonas rubra.

== Nomenclature ==
This enzyme was previously classified as EC 4.3.99.2.
