= Bacterial binding protein-dependent transporter =

Protein family

BPD_transp_1

Identifiers
- Symbol: BPD_transp_1
- Pfam: PF00528
- Pfam clan: CL0404
- InterPro: IPR000515
- PROSITE: PDOC00364
- TCDB: 3.A.1
- OPM superfamily: 17
- OPM protein: 3puz
Available protein structures:
- PDB: IPR000515 PF00528 (ECOD; PDBsum)
- AlphaFold: IPR000515; PF00528

Bacterial binding protein-dependent transport systems, are multicomponent systems typically composed of a periplasmic substrate-binding protein, one or two reciprocally homologous integral inner-membrane proteins and one or two peripheral membrane ATP-binding proteins that couple energy to the active transport system. The integral inner-membrane proteins translocate the substrate across the membrane. It has been shown, that most of these proteins contain a conserved region located about 80 to 100 residues from their C-terminal extremity. This region seems to be located in a cytoplasmic loop between two transmembrane domains. Apart from the conserved region, the sequence of these proteins is quite divergent, and they have a variable number of transmembrane helices, however they can be classified into seven families which have been respectively termed: araH, cysTW, fecCD, hisMQ, livHM, malFG and oppBC.
