= ATP-binding motif =

Molecular structure of adenosine triphosphate (ATP)

An ATP-binding motif is a 250-residue sequence within an ATP-binding protein’s primary structure. The binding motif is associated with a protein’s structure and/or function. ATP is a molecule of energy, and can be a coenzyme, involved in a number of biological reactions. ATP is proficient at interacting with other molecules through a binding site. The ATP binding site is the environment in which ATP catalytically actives the enzyme and, as a result, is hydrolyzed to ADP. The binding of ATP causes a conformational change to the enzyme it is interacting with.

The genetic and functional similarity of such a motif demonstrates micro-evolution: proteins have co-opted the same binding sequence from other enzymes rather than developing them independently.

ATP binding sites, which may be representative of an ATP binding motif, are present in many proteins which require an input of energy (from ATP), such sites as active membrane transporters, microtubule subunits, flagellum proteins, and various hydrolytic and proteolytic enzymes.

== Primary sequence ==
The short motifs involving ATP-binding are the Walker motifs, Walker A, also known as the P-loop, and Walker B, as well as the C motif and switch motif.

=== Walker A motif ===
The Walker site A has a primary amino acid sequence of GxxGxGKS or GxxGxGKT. The letter x can represent any amino acid.

=== Walker B motif ===
The primary amino acid sequence of the Walker B site is hhhhD, in which h represents any hydrophobic amino acid.

=== C motif ===
The C motif, also known as the signature motif, LSGGQ motif, or the linker peptide, has a primary amino acid sequence of LSGGQQ/R/KQR.

Due to the variety of different amino acids that can be used in the primary sequence, of both the Walker site A and B, the non-variant amino acids within the sequence are highly conserved. A mutation of any of these amino acids will affect the binding ATP or interfere with the catalytic activity of the enzyme. The primary amino acid sequence determines the three dimensional structure of each motif.

== Structure ==
All of the ATP binding domains are made up of an estimated 250 residues and two subunits, creating a dimer. These residues are folded into six α-helices and five β-strands.

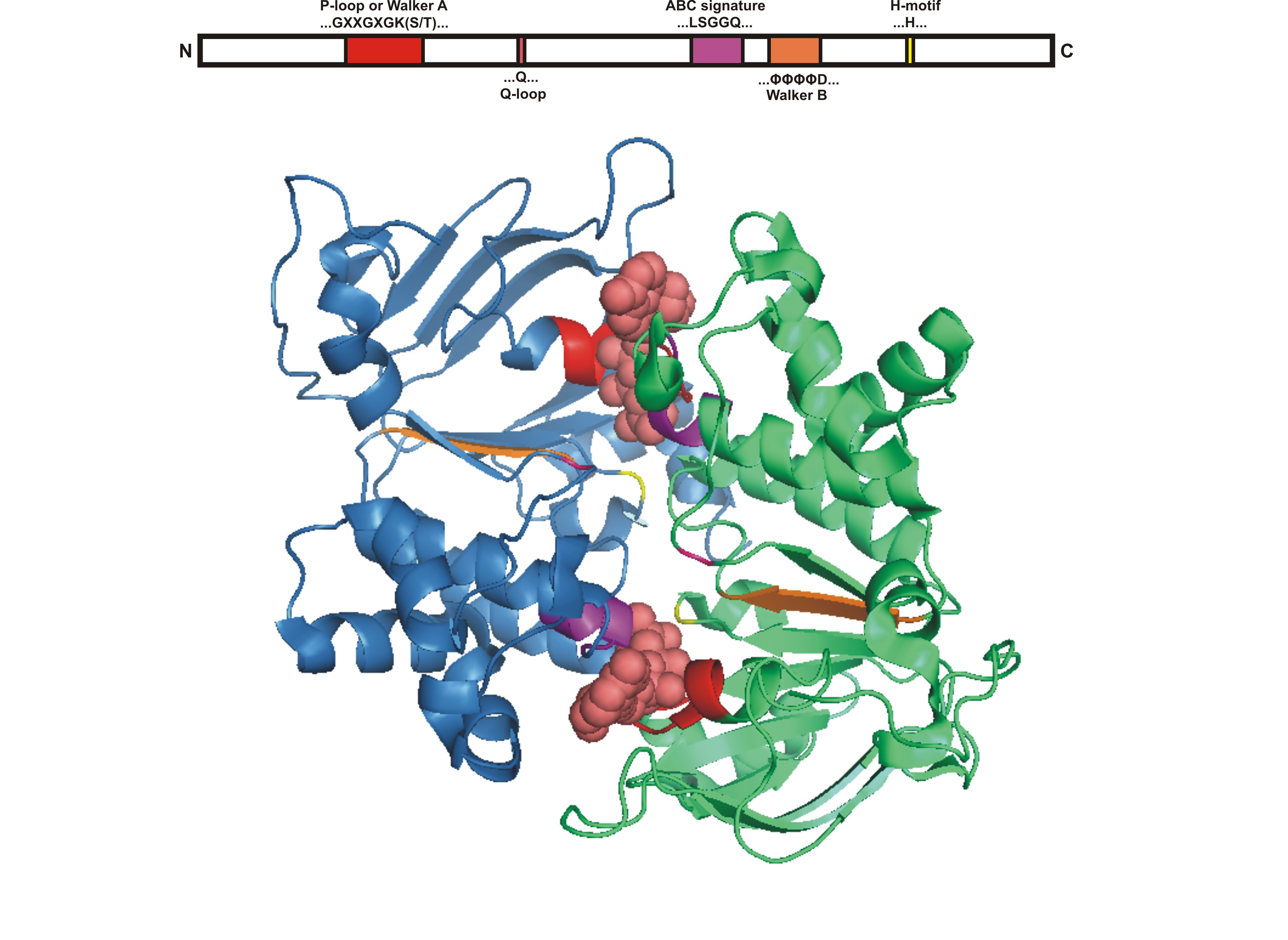
Structure of the nucleotide binding domain of ATP-binding cassette transporters

=== Walker A motif ===
Structurally, the Walker A motif consists of an α-helix and is always followed by a glycine-rich loop.

=== Walker B motif ===
The Walker B motif is a β-strand. The Walker motifs are connected to each other by a peptide sequence of about 100 residues. Structurally, these connecting residues fold into an α-helical domain.

=== C motif ===
Directly following the Walker B motif, is the signature motif.

=== Switch motif ===
The switch motif has been found to be located at the end of the β4-strand in ATP-binding proteins.

== Function ==
Each ATP binding motif has a different role to play whether it is directly involved with the binding of ATP or helping with the construction of the ATP-binding cassette (ABC) transporter. The ATP molecule binds to the connecting point of each subunit of the dimer, indicating that ATP is in close proximity to both subunits during catalysis. The two binding motifs that ATP directly interacts with is the residues from the Walker A motif, located on one of the subunits, and the residues from the C binding motif, located on the other subunit. The Walker A binding motif has a lysine side chain, which is essential for the binding of ATP. The lysine residue forms hydrogen bonds with the oxygen atoms of two phosphate groups within ATP, therefore creating proximity and orientation of ATP in the binding site.

In order for the Walker A motif to bind to ATP, the ATP molecule must be in the binding site. The signature motif acts as a signal to the Walker A motif, letting the Walker A know when the ATP molecule has bound to the binding site. The signature motif does this by allowing its residues to extend from the subunit they are located into the other subunit where the Walker A motif is. It is necessary that ATP binds to both nucleotide binding domains in order to complete the catalytically active structure.

The Walker B motif contains the amino acid glutamate within the short sequence. Glutamate can be used to perform a nucleophilic attack on the ATP molecule.

Found in the switch binding motif is a histidine residue. The function of the histidine is to influence the reaction catalytically by contacting the residues across the dimer interface, including the Walker A motif and the Walker B motif. It is the histidine residue that forms the tight coupling between the binding of the ATP molecule and the dimer.

Following the hydrolysis of ADP, a conformational change must occur to separate the ATP-binding cassette. This separation is driven by an electrostatic repulsion by the ADP product that is bound the Walker A motif and the inorganic phosphate product is bound to the C motif.
